

399001–399100 

|-bgcolor=#E9E9E9
| 399001 ||  || — || September 25, 2006 || Mount Lemmon || Mount Lemmon Survey || — || align=right | 1.6 km || 
|-id=002 bgcolor=#E9E9E9
| 399002 ||  || — || March 17, 2004 || Kitt Peak || Spacewatch || — || align=right | 2.7 km || 
|-id=003 bgcolor=#fefefe
| 399003 ||  || — || February 7, 2002 || Socorro || LINEAR || V || align=right data-sort-value="0.85" | 850 m || 
|-id=004 bgcolor=#d6d6d6
| 399004 ||  || — || September 11, 2004 || Kitt Peak || Spacewatch || — || align=right | 3.1 km || 
|-id=005 bgcolor=#d6d6d6
| 399005 ||  || — || July 22, 2010 || WISE || WISE || — || align=right | 3.0 km || 
|-id=006 bgcolor=#d6d6d6
| 399006 ||  || — || March 16, 2002 || Socorro || LINEAR || — || align=right | 4.1 km || 
|-id=007 bgcolor=#d6d6d6
| 399007 ||  || — || March 11, 2007 || Kitt Peak || Spacewatch || — || align=right | 4.6 km || 
|-id=008 bgcolor=#d6d6d6
| 399008 ||  || — || July 25, 2010 || WISE || WISE || — || align=right | 5.1 km || 
|-id=009 bgcolor=#E9E9E9
| 399009 ||  || — || February 9, 2008 || Mount Lemmon || Mount Lemmon Survey || — || align=right | 2.8 km || 
|-id=010 bgcolor=#d6d6d6
| 399010 ||  || — || April 29, 2003 || Kitt Peak || Spacewatch || TEL || align=right | 1.7 km || 
|-id=011 bgcolor=#d6d6d6
| 399011 ||  || — || July 26, 1998 || Caussols || ODAS || — || align=right | 3.6 km || 
|-id=012 bgcolor=#E9E9E9
| 399012 ||  || — || March 5, 2008 || Mount Lemmon || Mount Lemmon Survey || — || align=right | 2.4 km || 
|-id=013 bgcolor=#d6d6d6
| 399013 ||  || — || November 10, 1999 || Kitt Peak || Spacewatch || — || align=right | 3.5 km || 
|-id=014 bgcolor=#E9E9E9
| 399014 ||  || — || February 3, 2008 || Mount Lemmon || Mount Lemmon Survey || — || align=right | 2.1 km || 
|-id=015 bgcolor=#E9E9E9
| 399015 ||  || — || April 10, 2005 || Mount Lemmon || Mount Lemmon Survey || — || align=right | 1.2 km || 
|-id=016 bgcolor=#d6d6d6
| 399016 ||  || — || December 2, 2010 || Mount Lemmon || Mount Lemmon Survey || LUT || align=right | 6.1 km || 
|-id=017 bgcolor=#d6d6d6
| 399017 ||  || — || October 30, 2005 || Kitt Peak || Spacewatch || — || align=right | 2.7 km || 
|-id=018 bgcolor=#E9E9E9
| 399018 ||  || — || March 26, 2004 || Kitt Peak || Spacewatch || — || align=right | 2.7 km || 
|-id=019 bgcolor=#fefefe
| 399019 ||  || — || March 9, 2005 || Catalina || CSS || — || align=right | 1.1 km || 
|-id=020 bgcolor=#d6d6d6
| 399020 ||  || — || September 23, 2009 || Mount Lemmon || Mount Lemmon Survey || — || align=right | 3.1 km || 
|-id=021 bgcolor=#fefefe
| 399021 ||  || — || November 5, 1999 || Kitt Peak || Spacewatch || SUL || align=right | 2.6 km || 
|-id=022 bgcolor=#d6d6d6
| 399022 ||  || — || March 9, 2007 || Mount Lemmon || Mount Lemmon Survey || THM || align=right | 2.1 km || 
|-id=023 bgcolor=#E9E9E9
| 399023 ||  || — || May 20, 2004 || Campo Imperatore || CINEOS || HOF || align=right | 2.9 km || 
|-id=024 bgcolor=#d6d6d6
| 399024 ||  || — || July 10, 2004 || Catalina || CSS || — || align=right | 2.9 km || 
|-id=025 bgcolor=#d6d6d6
| 399025 ||  || — || March 13, 2007 || Catalina || CSS || — || align=right | 3.4 km || 
|-id=026 bgcolor=#d6d6d6
| 399026 ||  || — || March 14, 2007 || Catalina || CSS || — || align=right | 3.9 km || 
|-id=027 bgcolor=#d6d6d6
| 399027 ||  || — || October 7, 2004 || Kitt Peak || Spacewatch || — || align=right | 2.9 km || 
|-id=028 bgcolor=#d6d6d6
| 399028 ||  || — || September 11, 2004 || Kitt Peak || Spacewatch || — || align=right | 3.0 km || 
|-id=029 bgcolor=#d6d6d6
| 399029 ||  || — || September 29, 2009 || Mount Lemmon || Mount Lemmon Survey || — || align=right | 3.3 km || 
|-id=030 bgcolor=#E9E9E9
| 399030 ||  || — || December 18, 2003 || Kitt Peak || Spacewatch || — || align=right | 1.5 km || 
|-id=031 bgcolor=#E9E9E9
| 399031 ||  || — || June 1, 2005 || Anderson Mesa || LONEOS || (194) || align=right | 2.2 km || 
|-id=032 bgcolor=#d6d6d6
| 399032 ||  || — || March 10, 2007 || Mount Lemmon || Mount Lemmon Survey || THM || align=right | 2.5 km || 
|-id=033 bgcolor=#E9E9E9
| 399033 ||  || — || October 1, 2010 || Mount Lemmon || Mount Lemmon Survey || — || align=right | 1.5 km || 
|-id=034 bgcolor=#d6d6d6
| 399034 ||  || — || July 22, 2010 || WISE || WISE || — || align=right | 4.5 km || 
|-id=035 bgcolor=#d6d6d6
| 399035 ||  || — || October 30, 2010 || Kitt Peak || Spacewatch || — || align=right | 4.0 km || 
|-id=036 bgcolor=#E9E9E9
| 399036 ||  || — || January 26, 2000 || Kitt Peak || Spacewatch || — || align=right | 1.2 km || 
|-id=037 bgcolor=#d6d6d6
| 399037 ||  || — || October 13, 1999 || Kitt Peak || Spacewatch || — || align=right | 2.8 km || 
|-id=038 bgcolor=#d6d6d6
| 399038 ||  || — || September 21, 2009 || Catalina || CSS || — || align=right | 3.4 km || 
|-id=039 bgcolor=#d6d6d6
| 399039 ||  || — || October 13, 2004 || Kitt Peak || Spacewatch || — || align=right | 3.1 km || 
|-id=040 bgcolor=#d6d6d6
| 399040 ||  || — || November 10, 2010 || Mount Lemmon || Mount Lemmon Survey || EOS || align=right | 1.8 km || 
|-id=041 bgcolor=#d6d6d6
| 399041 ||  || — || April 9, 2002 || Kitt Peak || Spacewatch || — || align=right | 3.7 km || 
|-id=042 bgcolor=#d6d6d6
| 399042 ||  || — || December 29, 2011 || Mount Lemmon || Mount Lemmon Survey || — || align=right | 3.9 km || 
|-id=043 bgcolor=#fefefe
| 399043 ||  || — || September 19, 2006 || Catalina || CSS || H || align=right data-sort-value="0.61" | 610 m || 
|-id=044 bgcolor=#d6d6d6
| 399044 ||  || — || May 15, 2002 || Anderson Mesa || LONEOS || — || align=right | 6.3 km || 
|-id=045 bgcolor=#E9E9E9
| 399045 ||  || — || May 19, 2004 || Kitt Peak || Spacewatch || — || align=right | 3.2 km || 
|-id=046 bgcolor=#d6d6d6
| 399046 ||  || — || November 3, 2004 || Kitt Peak || Spacewatch || EOS || align=right | 2.2 km || 
|-id=047 bgcolor=#d6d6d6
| 399047 ||  || — || October 1, 2003 || Kitt Peak || Spacewatch || — || align=right | 3.3 km || 
|-id=048 bgcolor=#E9E9E9
| 399048 ||  || — || September 30, 2006 || Mount Lemmon || Mount Lemmon Survey || — || align=right | 2.5 km || 
|-id=049 bgcolor=#d6d6d6
| 399049 ||  || — || July 29, 2008 || Mount Lemmon || Mount Lemmon Survey || — || align=right | 3.4 km || 
|-id=050 bgcolor=#E9E9E9
| 399050 || 2013 LF || — || September 30, 2010 || Mount Lemmon || Mount Lemmon Survey || — || align=right data-sort-value="0.98" | 980 m || 
|-id=051 bgcolor=#E9E9E9
| 399051 ||  || — || July 5, 2005 || Kitt Peak || Spacewatch || — || align=right | 1.3 km || 
|-id=052 bgcolor=#d6d6d6
| 399052 ||  || — || January 8, 2006 || Mount Lemmon || Mount Lemmon Survey || — || align=right | 4.5 km || 
|-id=053 bgcolor=#d6d6d6
| 399053 ||  || — || September 30, 2003 || Kitt Peak || Spacewatch || — || align=right | 2.4 km || 
|-id=054 bgcolor=#E9E9E9
| 399054 ||  || — || November 20, 2000 || Socorro || LINEAR || — || align=right | 2.4 km || 
|-id=055 bgcolor=#E9E9E9
| 399055 ||  || — || November 26, 2005 || Mount Lemmon || Mount Lemmon Survey || — || align=right | 1.5 km || 
|-id=056 bgcolor=#E9E9E9
| 399056 ||  || — || October 4, 2004 || Kitt Peak || Spacewatch || — || align=right | 1.5 km || 
|-id=057 bgcolor=#E9E9E9
| 399057 ||  || — || May 10, 2007 || Mount Lemmon || Mount Lemmon Survey || — || align=right | 2.4 km || 
|-id=058 bgcolor=#E9E9E9
| 399058 ||  || — || October 28, 2008 || Kitt Peak || Spacewatch || — || align=right | 2.1 km || 
|-id=059 bgcolor=#fefefe
| 399059 ||  || — || April 14, 2007 || Mount Lemmon || Mount Lemmon Survey || MAS || align=right data-sort-value="0.74" | 740 m || 
|-id=060 bgcolor=#E9E9E9
| 399060 ||  || — || May 31, 2006 || Mount Lemmon || Mount Lemmon Survey || — || align=right | 1.5 km || 
|-id=061 bgcolor=#E9E9E9
| 399061 ||  || — || November 16, 2000 || Kitt Peak || Spacewatch || — || align=right | 2.1 km || 
|-id=062 bgcolor=#E9E9E9
| 399062 ||  || — || February 21, 2006 || Catalina || CSS || — || align=right | 1.3 km || 
|-id=063 bgcolor=#E9E9E9
| 399063 ||  || — || March 24, 2006 || Anderson Mesa || LONEOS || — || align=right | 1.1 km || 
|-id=064 bgcolor=#E9E9E9
| 399064 ||  || — || February 2, 2005 || Catalina || CSS || — || align=right | 2.7 km || 
|-id=065 bgcolor=#E9E9E9
| 399065 ||  || — || July 5, 2003 || Kitt Peak || Spacewatch || — || align=right | 2.0 km || 
|-id=066 bgcolor=#E9E9E9
| 399066 ||  || — || February 3, 2001 || Kitt Peak || Spacewatch || — || align=right | 3.7 km || 
|-id=067 bgcolor=#fefefe
| 399067 ||  || — || March 14, 2004 || Kitt Peak || Spacewatch || — || align=right data-sort-value="0.75" | 750 m || 
|-id=068 bgcolor=#fefefe
| 399068 ||  || — || December 26, 2006 || Kitt Peak || Spacewatch || — || align=right | 1.0 km || 
|-id=069 bgcolor=#E9E9E9
| 399069 ||  || — || December 12, 1999 || Kitt Peak || Spacewatch || — || align=right | 1.6 km || 
|-id=070 bgcolor=#E9E9E9
| 399070 ||  || — || January 13, 2000 || Kitt Peak || Spacewatch || — || align=right | 2.3 km || 
|-id=071 bgcolor=#E9E9E9
| 399071 ||  || — || February 13, 2010 || Mount Lemmon || Mount Lemmon Survey || — || align=right | 2.1 km || 
|-id=072 bgcolor=#E9E9E9
| 399072 ||  || — || September 27, 2003 || Kitt Peak || Spacewatch || — || align=right | 2.8 km || 
|-id=073 bgcolor=#fefefe
| 399073 ||  || — || March 27, 2003 || Kitt Peak || Spacewatch || — || align=right data-sort-value="0.95" | 950 m || 
|-id=074 bgcolor=#E9E9E9
| 399074 ||  || — || April 2, 2006 || Mount Lemmon || Mount Lemmon Survey || — || align=right | 2.2 km || 
|-id=075 bgcolor=#d6d6d6
| 399075 ||  || — || October 10, 2012 || Mount Lemmon || Mount Lemmon Survey || — || align=right | 4.3 km || 
|-id=076 bgcolor=#E9E9E9
| 399076 ||  || — || September 12, 2007 || Kitt Peak || Spacewatch || — || align=right | 1.8 km || 
|-id=077 bgcolor=#fefefe
| 399077 ||  || — || April 28, 2003 || Kitt Peak || Spacewatch || — || align=right | 1.00 km || 
|-id=078 bgcolor=#d6d6d6
| 399078 ||  || — || November 20, 2006 || Kitt Peak || Spacewatch || — || align=right | 4.2 km || 
|-id=079 bgcolor=#d6d6d6
| 399079 ||  || — || January 19, 2008 || Mount Lemmon || Mount Lemmon Survey || — || align=right | 4.4 km || 
|-id=080 bgcolor=#d6d6d6
| 399080 ||  || — || April 17, 2009 || Catalina || CSS || — || align=right | 2.9 km || 
|-id=081 bgcolor=#fefefe
| 399081 ||  || — || April 28, 1997 || Kitt Peak || Spacewatch || — || align=right | 1.00 km || 
|-id=082 bgcolor=#d6d6d6
| 399082 ||  || — || April 1, 2009 || XuYi || PMO NEO || — || align=right | 4.5 km || 
|-id=083 bgcolor=#E9E9E9
| 399083 ||  || — || December 12, 2004 || Kitt Peak || Spacewatch || — || align=right | 1.9 km || 
|-id=084 bgcolor=#E9E9E9
| 399084 ||  || — || November 18, 2008 || Kitt Peak || Spacewatch || — || align=right | 2.6 km || 
|-id=085 bgcolor=#d6d6d6
| 399085 ||  || — || January 16, 2008 || Kitt Peak || Spacewatch || — || align=right | 3.8 km || 
|-id=086 bgcolor=#E9E9E9
| 399086 ||  || — || October 2, 2003 || Kitt Peak || Spacewatch || MAR || align=right | 1.5 km || 
|-id=087 bgcolor=#E9E9E9
| 399087 ||  || — || September 20, 1995 || Kitt Peak || Spacewatch || — || align=right | 1.00 km || 
|-id=088 bgcolor=#fefefe
| 399088 ||  || — || October 15, 2004 || Mount Lemmon || Mount Lemmon Survey || MAS || align=right data-sort-value="0.94" | 940 m || 
|-id=089 bgcolor=#E9E9E9
| 399089 ||  || — || April 11, 2005 || Kitt Peak || Spacewatch || — || align=right | 3.0 km || 
|-id=090 bgcolor=#fefefe
| 399090 ||  || — || February 8, 2002 || Socorro || LINEAR || — || align=right | 1.3 km || 
|-id=091 bgcolor=#C2FFFF
| 399091 ||  || — || October 17, 2009 || Mount Lemmon || Mount Lemmon Survey || L4 || align=right | 8.9 km || 
|-id=092 bgcolor=#d6d6d6
| 399092 ||  || — || October 22, 2006 || Kitt Peak || Spacewatch || — || align=right | 3.4 km || 
|-id=093 bgcolor=#E9E9E9
| 399093 ||  || — || January 13, 2010 || WISE || WISE || — || align=right | 1.9 km || 
|-id=094 bgcolor=#E9E9E9
| 399094 ||  || — || May 28, 1997 || Kitt Peak || Spacewatch || — || align=right | 2.8 km || 
|-id=095 bgcolor=#E9E9E9
| 399095 ||  || — || January 20, 2009 || Mount Lemmon || Mount Lemmon Survey || GEF || align=right | 1.3 km || 
|-id=096 bgcolor=#d6d6d6
| 399096 ||  || — || February 1, 2009 || Mount Lemmon || Mount Lemmon Survey || — || align=right | 2.9 km || 
|-id=097 bgcolor=#E9E9E9
| 399097 ||  || — || May 23, 2006 || Anderson Mesa || LONEOS || EUN || align=right | 1.5 km || 
|-id=098 bgcolor=#E9E9E9
| 399098 ||  || — || October 1, 2008 || Catalina || CSS || — || align=right | 1.1 km || 
|-id=099 bgcolor=#fefefe
| 399099 ||  || — || October 9, 2005 || Kitt Peak || Spacewatch || — || align=right data-sort-value="0.86" | 860 m || 
|-id=100 bgcolor=#d6d6d6
| 399100 ||  || — || September 26, 2006 || Kitt Peak || Spacewatch || EMA || align=right | 2.7 km || 
|}

399101–399200 

|-bgcolor=#fefefe
| 399101 ||  || — || April 1, 2011 || Kitt Peak || Spacewatch || — || align=right data-sort-value="0.58" | 580 m || 
|-id=102 bgcolor=#fefefe
| 399102 ||  || — || October 12, 2005 || Kitt Peak || Spacewatch || — || align=right data-sort-value="0.65" | 650 m || 
|-id=103 bgcolor=#d6d6d6
| 399103 ||  || — || December 19, 2007 || Kitt Peak || Spacewatch || — || align=right | 2.7 km || 
|-id=104 bgcolor=#d6d6d6
| 399104 ||  || — || March 26, 2003 || Kitt Peak || Spacewatch || — || align=right | 4.2 km || 
|-id=105 bgcolor=#E9E9E9
| 399105 ||  || — || March 12, 2010 || Mount Lemmon || Mount Lemmon Survey || — || align=right | 1.1 km || 
|-id=106 bgcolor=#fefefe
| 399106 ||  || — || December 24, 2005 || Kitt Peak || Spacewatch || MAS || align=right data-sort-value="0.64" | 640 m || 
|-id=107 bgcolor=#fefefe
| 399107 ||  || — || October 27, 2008 || Mount Lemmon || Mount Lemmon Survey || — || align=right | 1.2 km || 
|-id=108 bgcolor=#fefefe
| 399108 ||  || — || March 15, 2007 || Mount Lemmon || Mount Lemmon Survey || — || align=right data-sort-value="0.94" | 940 m || 
|-id=109 bgcolor=#d6d6d6
| 399109 ||  || — || March 10, 2003 || Kitt Peak || Spacewatch || — || align=right | 3.5 km || 
|-id=110 bgcolor=#E9E9E9
| 399110 ||  || — || March 23, 1996 || Kitt Peak || Spacewatch || — || align=right | 2.1 km || 
|-id=111 bgcolor=#E9E9E9
| 399111 ||  || — || April 14, 2005 || Kitt Peak || Spacewatch || — || align=right | 2.1 km || 
|-id=112 bgcolor=#fefefe
| 399112 ||  || — || April 5, 2003 || Kitt Peak || Spacewatch || NYS || align=right data-sort-value="0.65" | 650 m || 
|-id=113 bgcolor=#E9E9E9
| 399113 ||  || — || November 7, 2012 || Mount Lemmon || Mount Lemmon Survey || — || align=right | 2.5 km || 
|-id=114 bgcolor=#fefefe
| 399114 ||  || — || March 13, 2011 || Mount Lemmon || Mount Lemmon Survey || — || align=right data-sort-value="0.65" | 650 m || 
|-id=115 bgcolor=#d6d6d6
| 399115 ||  || — || February 12, 2008 || Mount Lemmon || Mount Lemmon Survey || — || align=right | 3.5 km || 
|-id=116 bgcolor=#fefefe
| 399116 ||  || — || July 19, 2004 || Anderson Mesa || LONEOS || NYS || align=right data-sort-value="0.86" | 860 m || 
|-id=117 bgcolor=#d6d6d6
| 399117 ||  || — || March 29, 2008 || Catalina || CSS || 7:4 || align=right | 6.2 km || 
|-id=118 bgcolor=#fefefe
| 399118 ||  || — || April 13, 1996 || Kitt Peak || Spacewatch || — || align=right data-sort-value="0.69" | 690 m || 
|-id=119 bgcolor=#E9E9E9
| 399119 ||  || — || March 9, 2005 || Kitt Peak || Spacewatch || — || align=right | 1.6 km || 
|-id=120 bgcolor=#C2FFFF
| 399120 ||  || — || September 24, 2008 || Mount Lemmon || Mount Lemmon Survey || L4 || align=right | 8.5 km || 
|-id=121 bgcolor=#fefefe
| 399121 ||  || — || March 27, 2003 || Kitt Peak || Spacewatch || NYS || align=right data-sort-value="0.81" | 810 m || 
|-id=122 bgcolor=#d6d6d6
| 399122 ||  || — || August 28, 2006 || Kitt Peak || Spacewatch || KOR || align=right | 1.7 km || 
|-id=123 bgcolor=#d6d6d6
| 399123 ||  || — || March 15, 2004 || Kitt Peak || Spacewatch || — || align=right | 2.7 km || 
|-id=124 bgcolor=#fefefe
| 399124 ||  || — || January 27, 2007 || Kitt Peak || Spacewatch || — || align=right data-sort-value="0.70" | 700 m || 
|-id=125 bgcolor=#fefefe
| 399125 ||  || — || October 12, 2005 || Kitt Peak || Spacewatch || MAS || align=right data-sort-value="0.68" | 680 m || 
|-id=126 bgcolor=#fefefe
| 399126 ||  || — || February 13, 2010 || Mount Lemmon || Mount Lemmon Survey || — || align=right data-sort-value="0.98" | 980 m || 
|-id=127 bgcolor=#E9E9E9
| 399127 ||  || — || November 24, 2003 || Kitt Peak || Spacewatch || — || align=right | 1.9 km || 
|-id=128 bgcolor=#fefefe
| 399128 ||  || — || May 15, 2004 || Socorro || LINEAR || — || align=right data-sort-value="0.76" | 760 m || 
|-id=129 bgcolor=#E9E9E9
| 399129 || 2014 EB || — || March 11, 2010 || WISE || WISE || — || align=right | 2.9 km || 
|-id=130 bgcolor=#E9E9E9
| 399130 ||  || — || December 9, 2004 || Kitt Peak || Spacewatch || — || align=right | 1.5 km || 
|-id=131 bgcolor=#fefefe
| 399131 ||  || — || October 30, 2005 || Kitt Peak || Spacewatch || — || align=right data-sort-value="0.98" | 980 m || 
|-id=132 bgcolor=#E9E9E9
| 399132 ||  || — || September 12, 2007 || Mount Lemmon || Mount Lemmon Survey || WIT || align=right | 1.2 km || 
|-id=133 bgcolor=#d6d6d6
| 399133 ||  || — || September 22, 1995 || Kitt Peak || Spacewatch || TIR || align=right | 2.0 km || 
|-id=134 bgcolor=#d6d6d6
| 399134 ||  || — || November 8, 2007 || Mount Lemmon || Mount Lemmon Survey || — || align=right | 2.4 km || 
|-id=135 bgcolor=#fefefe
| 399135 ||  || — || March 18, 2004 || Kitt Peak || Spacewatch || — || align=right data-sort-value="0.74" | 740 m || 
|-id=136 bgcolor=#fefefe
| 399136 ||  || — || November 1, 2008 || Mount Lemmon || Mount Lemmon Survey || — || align=right data-sort-value="0.98" | 980 m || 
|-id=137 bgcolor=#E9E9E9
| 399137 ||  || — || September 10, 2007 || Kitt Peak || Spacewatch || — || align=right | 2.4 km || 
|-id=138 bgcolor=#E9E9E9
| 399138 ||  || — || January 17, 2005 || Kitt Peak || Spacewatch || — || align=right | 2.1 km || 
|-id=139 bgcolor=#fefefe
| 399139 ||  || — || December 5, 2005 || Mount Lemmon || Mount Lemmon Survey || MAS || align=right data-sort-value="0.71" | 710 m || 
|-id=140 bgcolor=#C2FFFF
| 399140 ||  || — || August 16, 2009 || Kitt Peak || Spacewatch || L4 || align=right | 9.5 km || 
|-id=141 bgcolor=#d6d6d6
| 399141 ||  || — || January 15, 2008 || Mount Lemmon || Mount Lemmon Survey || EOS || align=right | 2.0 km || 
|-id=142 bgcolor=#d6d6d6
| 399142 ||  || — || February 1, 2008 || Mount Lemmon || Mount Lemmon Survey || — || align=right | 3.8 km || 
|-id=143 bgcolor=#E9E9E9
| 399143 ||  || — || April 6, 1994 || Kitt Peak || Spacewatch || MAR || align=right | 1.4 km || 
|-id=144 bgcolor=#d6d6d6
| 399144 ||  || — || January 27, 2003 || Socorro || LINEAR || — || align=right | 3.7 km || 
|-id=145 bgcolor=#fefefe
| 399145 ||  || — || April 22, 2007 || Mount Lemmon || Mount Lemmon Survey || — || align=right | 1.1 km || 
|-id=146 bgcolor=#E9E9E9
| 399146 ||  || — || June 16, 2005 || Mount Lemmon || Mount Lemmon Survey || — || align=right | 2.6 km || 
|-id=147 bgcolor=#fefefe
| 399147 ||  || — || December 10, 2009 || Mount Lemmon || Mount Lemmon Survey || — || align=right data-sort-value="0.78" | 780 m || 
|-id=148 bgcolor=#d6d6d6
| 399148 ||  || — || October 4, 2006 || Mount Lemmon || Mount Lemmon Survey || — || align=right | 3.5 km || 
|-id=149 bgcolor=#E9E9E9
| 399149 ||  || — || February 26, 2010 || WISE || WISE || — || align=right | 2.8 km || 
|-id=150 bgcolor=#fefefe
| 399150 ||  || — || May 11, 2003 || Kitt Peak || Spacewatch || — || align=right data-sort-value="0.82" | 820 m || 
|-id=151 bgcolor=#d6d6d6
| 399151 ||  || — || January 7, 2002 || Kitt Peak || Spacewatch || — || align=right | 4.5 km || 
|-id=152 bgcolor=#fefefe
| 399152 ||  || — || December 31, 2002 || Socorro || LINEAR || — || align=right | 1.4 km || 
|-id=153 bgcolor=#C2FFFF
| 399153 ||  || — || October 27, 2009 || Mount Lemmon || Mount Lemmon Survey || L4ARK || align=right | 11 km || 
|-id=154 bgcolor=#E9E9E9
| 399154 ||  || — || April 5, 2005 || Catalina || CSS || — || align=right | 3.0 km || 
|-id=155 bgcolor=#fefefe
| 399155 ||  || — || May 12, 2007 || Kitt Peak || Spacewatch || — || align=right data-sort-value="0.59" | 590 m || 
|-id=156 bgcolor=#E9E9E9
| 399156 ||  || — || October 27, 2012 || Mount Lemmon || Mount Lemmon Survey || — || align=right | 1.9 km || 
|-id=157 bgcolor=#d6d6d6
| 399157 ||  || — || August 18, 2006 || Kitt Peak || Spacewatch || — || align=right | 3.0 km || 
|-id=158 bgcolor=#d6d6d6
| 399158 ||  || — || September 13, 2005 || Kitt Peak || Spacewatch || — || align=right | 2.0 km || 
|-id=159 bgcolor=#d6d6d6
| 399159 ||  || — || September 24, 2000 || Socorro || LINEAR || EUP || align=right | 3.4 km || 
|-id=160 bgcolor=#E9E9E9
| 399160 ||  || — || January 13, 2005 || Kitt Peak || Spacewatch || LEO || align=right | 1.9 km || 
|-id=161 bgcolor=#fefefe
| 399161 ||  || — || December 19, 2009 || Mount Lemmon || Mount Lemmon Survey || — || align=right | 1.2 km || 
|-id=162 bgcolor=#d6d6d6
| 399162 ||  || — || July 16, 2004 || Siding Spring || SSS || — || align=right | 4.2 km || 
|-id=163 bgcolor=#fefefe
| 399163 ||  || — || October 30, 2005 || Kitt Peak || Spacewatch || — || align=right data-sort-value="0.73" | 730 m || 
|-id=164 bgcolor=#E9E9E9
| 399164 ||  || — || March 21, 2010 || Catalina || CSS || — || align=right | 1.3 km || 
|-id=165 bgcolor=#fefefe
| 399165 ||  || — || January 11, 2010 || Kitt Peak || Spacewatch || — || align=right | 1.5 km || 
|-id=166 bgcolor=#E9E9E9
| 399166 ||  || — || March 14, 2010 || Kitt Peak || Spacewatch || — || align=right | 1.2 km || 
|-id=167 bgcolor=#d6d6d6
| 399167 ||  || — || February 27, 2008 || Mount Lemmon || Mount Lemmon Survey || EOS || align=right | 1.9 km || 
|-id=168 bgcolor=#fefefe
| 399168 ||  || — || October 6, 2008 || Kitt Peak || Spacewatch || — || align=right data-sort-value="0.80" | 800 m || 
|-id=169 bgcolor=#fefefe
| 399169 ||  || — || March 19, 2004 || Socorro || LINEAR || — || align=right data-sort-value="0.78" | 780 m || 
|-id=170 bgcolor=#fefefe
| 399170 ||  || — || December 25, 2005 || Kitt Peak || Spacewatch || MAS || align=right data-sort-value="0.68" | 680 m || 
|-id=171 bgcolor=#fefefe
| 399171 ||  || — || October 15, 2001 || Kitt Peak || Spacewatch || — || align=right data-sort-value="0.83" | 830 m || 
|-id=172 bgcolor=#d6d6d6
| 399172 ||  || — || November 18, 2006 || Kitt Peak || Spacewatch || — || align=right | 4.4 km || 
|-id=173 bgcolor=#E9E9E9
| 399173 ||  || — || January 20, 2009 || Kitt Peak || Spacewatch || — || align=right | 2.0 km || 
|-id=174 bgcolor=#d6d6d6
| 399174 ||  || — || November 21, 2006 || Mount Lemmon || Mount Lemmon Survey || LIX || align=right | 6.4 km || 
|-id=175 bgcolor=#fefefe
| 399175 ||  || — || October 8, 2008 || Mount Lemmon || Mount Lemmon Survey || — || align=right | 2.0 km || 
|-id=176 bgcolor=#fefefe
| 399176 ||  || — || December 21, 2006 || Mount Lemmon || Mount Lemmon Survey || — || align=right data-sort-value="0.99" | 990 m || 
|-id=177 bgcolor=#fefefe
| 399177 ||  || — || March 8, 2003 || Socorro || LINEAR || — || align=right data-sort-value="0.85" | 850 m || 
|-id=178 bgcolor=#d6d6d6
| 399178 ||  || — || April 22, 2009 || Kitt Peak || Spacewatch || — || align=right | 3.7 km || 
|-id=179 bgcolor=#E9E9E9
| 399179 ||  || — || October 12, 2007 || Kitt Peak || Spacewatch || — || align=right | 2.0 km || 
|-id=180 bgcolor=#d6d6d6
| 399180 ||  || — || October 18, 2006 || Kitt Peak || Spacewatch || — || align=right | 3.5 km || 
|-id=181 bgcolor=#fefefe
| 399181 ||  || — || November 26, 2009 || Kitt Peak || Spacewatch || — || align=right data-sort-value="0.77" | 770 m || 
|-id=182 bgcolor=#E9E9E9
| 399182 ||  || — || April 11, 2005 || Kitt Peak || Spacewatch || — || align=right | 2.2 km || 
|-id=183 bgcolor=#d6d6d6
| 399183 ||  || — || March 6, 2008 || Mount Lemmon || Mount Lemmon Survey || — || align=right | 2.6 km || 
|-id=184 bgcolor=#fefefe
| 399184 ||  || — || January 28, 2007 || Kitt Peak || Spacewatch || — || align=right data-sort-value="0.77" | 770 m || 
|-id=185 bgcolor=#d6d6d6
| 399185 ||  || — || April 27, 2009 || Catalina || CSS || — || align=right | 4.7 km || 
|-id=186 bgcolor=#fefefe
| 399186 ||  || — || February 7, 1999 || Kitt Peak || Spacewatch || — || align=right data-sort-value="0.88" | 880 m || 
|-id=187 bgcolor=#fefefe
| 399187 ||  || — || January 30, 2006 || Kitt Peak || Spacewatch || — || align=right data-sort-value="0.98" | 980 m || 
|-id=188 bgcolor=#d6d6d6
| 399188 ||  || — || February 7, 2008 || Kitt Peak || Spacewatch || — || align=right | 2.5 km || 
|-id=189 bgcolor=#E9E9E9
| 399189 ||  || — || April 7, 2005 || Kitt Peak || Spacewatch || — || align=right | 2.1 km || 
|-id=190 bgcolor=#fefefe
| 399190 ||  || — || March 14, 2007 || Mount Lemmon || Mount Lemmon Survey || MAS || align=right data-sort-value="0.68" | 680 m || 
|-id=191 bgcolor=#fefefe
| 399191 ||  || — || October 11, 2005 || Kitt Peak || Spacewatch || — || align=right data-sort-value="0.71" | 710 m || 
|-id=192 bgcolor=#fefefe
| 399192 ||  || — || December 2, 2008 || Kitt Peak || Spacewatch || — || align=right | 1.7 km || 
|-id=193 bgcolor=#fefefe
| 399193 ||  || — || October 8, 2008 || Kitt Peak || Spacewatch || — || align=right | 1.0 km || 
|-id=194 bgcolor=#fefefe
| 399194 ||  || — || January 27, 2006 || Kitt Peak || Spacewatch || NYS || align=right data-sort-value="0.69" | 690 m || 
|-id=195 bgcolor=#d6d6d6
| 399195 ||  || — || April 24, 2004 || Kitt Peak || Spacewatch || — || align=right | 2.5 km || 
|-id=196 bgcolor=#E9E9E9
| 399196 ||  || — || November 9, 2007 || Kitt Peak || Spacewatch || — || align=right | 1.9 km || 
|-id=197 bgcolor=#E9E9E9
| 399197 ||  || — || September 14, 2006 || Kitt Peak || Spacewatch || — || align=right | 3.7 km || 
|-id=198 bgcolor=#d6d6d6
| 399198 ||  || — || April 4, 2003 || Kitt Peak || Spacewatch || — || align=right | 2.7 km || 
|-id=199 bgcolor=#fefefe
| 399199 ||  || — || June 24, 2007 || Kitt Peak || Spacewatch || — || align=right | 1.00 km || 
|-id=200 bgcolor=#fefefe
| 399200 ||  || — || April 26, 2003 || Kitt Peak || Spacewatch || — || align=right data-sort-value="0.95" | 950 m || 
|}

399201–399300 

|-bgcolor=#E9E9E9
| 399201 ||  || — || November 12, 2007 || Catalina || CSS || — || align=right | 1.3 km || 
|-id=202 bgcolor=#fefefe
| 399202 ||  || — || September 9, 2004 || Kitt Peak || Spacewatch || — || align=right data-sort-value="0.93" | 930 m || 
|-id=203 bgcolor=#E9E9E9
| 399203 ||  || — || April 11, 2005 || Kitt Peak || Spacewatch || — || align=right | 1.8 km || 
|-id=204 bgcolor=#d6d6d6
| 399204 ||  || — || October 25, 2005 || Mount Lemmon || Mount Lemmon Survey || THM || align=right | 2.5 km || 
|-id=205 bgcolor=#E9E9E9
| 399205 ||  || — || March 9, 2005 || Kitt Peak || Spacewatch || EUN || align=right | 2.7 km || 
|-id=206 bgcolor=#fefefe
| 399206 ||  || — || February 13, 2010 || Mount Lemmon || Mount Lemmon Survey || — || align=right data-sort-value="0.68" | 680 m || 
|-id=207 bgcolor=#E9E9E9
| 399207 ||  || — || April 30, 2006 || Kitt Peak || Spacewatch || — || align=right data-sort-value="0.97" | 970 m || 
|-id=208 bgcolor=#d6d6d6
| 399208 ||  || — || May 26, 2003 || Kitt Peak || Spacewatch || TIR || align=right | 2.6 km || 
|-id=209 bgcolor=#fefefe
| 399209 ||  || — || December 2, 2008 || Kitt Peak || Spacewatch || CLA || align=right | 1.9 km || 
|-id=210 bgcolor=#d6d6d6
| 399210 ||  || — || October 24, 2005 || Kitt Peak || Spacewatch || — || align=right | 3.5 km || 
|-id=211 bgcolor=#d6d6d6
| 399211 ||  || — || March 3, 2008 || Mount Lemmon || Mount Lemmon Survey || EOS || align=right | 1.8 km || 
|-id=212 bgcolor=#fefefe
| 399212 ||  || — || October 30, 2005 || Kitt Peak || Spacewatch || — || align=right data-sort-value="0.79" | 790 m || 
|-id=213 bgcolor=#E9E9E9
| 399213 ||  || — || May 4, 2000 || Kitt Peak || Spacewatch || — || align=right | 3.5 km || 
|-id=214 bgcolor=#fefefe
| 399214 ||  || — || September 18, 1995 || Kitt Peak || Spacewatch || — || align=right data-sort-value="0.75" | 750 m || 
|-id=215 bgcolor=#d6d6d6
| 399215 ||  || — || October 28, 2005 || Catalina || CSS || — || align=right | 4.2 km || 
|-id=216 bgcolor=#d6d6d6
| 399216 ||  || — || April 5, 2003 || Kitt Peak || Spacewatch || — || align=right | 4.0 km || 
|-id=217 bgcolor=#d6d6d6
| 399217 ||  || — || December 22, 2006 || Kitt Peak || Spacewatch || HYG || align=right | 3.4 km || 
|-id=218 bgcolor=#fefefe
| 399218 ||  || — || July 25, 2004 || Anderson Mesa || LONEOS || — || align=right data-sort-value="0.94" | 940 m || 
|-id=219 bgcolor=#d6d6d6
| 399219 ||  || — || August 31, 2005 || Kitt Peak || Spacewatch || — || align=right | 2.5 km || 
|-id=220 bgcolor=#E9E9E9
| 399220 ||  || — || November 5, 1999 || Kitt Peak || Spacewatch || — || align=right | 1.7 km || 
|-id=221 bgcolor=#d6d6d6
| 399221 ||  || — || March 5, 2008 || Mount Lemmon || Mount Lemmon Survey || — || align=right | 4.0 km || 
|-id=222 bgcolor=#fefefe
| 399222 ||  || — || March 15, 2007 || Mount Lemmon || Mount Lemmon Survey || — || align=right data-sort-value="0.88" | 880 m || 
|-id=223 bgcolor=#fefefe
| 399223 ||  || — || September 20, 1995 || Kitt Peak || Spacewatch || — || align=right data-sort-value="0.82" | 820 m || 
|-id=224 bgcolor=#fefefe
| 399224 ||  || — || April 13, 2004 || Kitt Peak || Spacewatch || — || align=right data-sort-value="0.73" | 730 m || 
|-id=225 bgcolor=#fefefe
| 399225 ||  || — || February 24, 2006 || Mount Lemmon || Mount Lemmon Survey || — || align=right data-sort-value="0.85" | 850 m || 
|-id=226 bgcolor=#d6d6d6
| 399226 ||  || — || September 18, 2006 || Kitt Peak || Spacewatch || KOR || align=right | 1.6 km || 
|-id=227 bgcolor=#d6d6d6
| 399227 ||  || — || April 21, 2003 || Catalina || CSS || — || align=right | 4.5 km || 
|-id=228 bgcolor=#d6d6d6
| 399228 ||  || — || October 29, 2000 || Kitt Peak || Spacewatch || — || align=right | 2.6 km || 
|-id=229 bgcolor=#fefefe
| 399229 ||  || — || December 21, 2005 || Kitt Peak || Spacewatch || (2076) || align=right data-sort-value="0.91" | 910 m || 
|-id=230 bgcolor=#fefefe
| 399230 ||  || — || November 18, 1998 || Kitt Peak || Spacewatch || — || align=right | 1.9 km || 
|-id=231 bgcolor=#d6d6d6
| 399231 || 2014 HA || — || October 12, 2005 || Kitt Peak || Spacewatch || — || align=right | 5.7 km || 
|-id=232 bgcolor=#d6d6d6
| 399232 || 2014 HQ || — || February 26, 2008 || Kitt Peak || Spacewatch || — || align=right | 2.3 km || 
|-id=233 bgcolor=#d6d6d6
| 399233 || 2014 HT || — || May 29, 2003 || Kitt Peak || Spacewatch || — || align=right | 3.4 km || 
|-id=234 bgcolor=#fefefe
| 399234 || 2014 HV || — || April 4, 2003 || Kitt Peak || Spacewatch || — || align=right | 1.2 km || 
|-id=235 bgcolor=#d6d6d6
| 399235 ||  || — || February 11, 2008 || Kitt Peak || Spacewatch || — || align=right | 2.9 km || 
|-id=236 bgcolor=#E9E9E9
| 399236 ||  || — || September 4, 2007 || Catalina || CSS || — || align=right | 1.0 km || 
|-id=237 bgcolor=#E9E9E9
| 399237 ||  || — || October 8, 2008 || Mount Lemmon || Mount Lemmon Survey || — || align=right | 2.2 km || 
|-id=238 bgcolor=#fefefe
| 399238 ||  || — || April 5, 2003 || Kitt Peak || Spacewatch || V || align=right data-sort-value="0.68" | 680 m || 
|-id=239 bgcolor=#fefefe
| 399239 ||  || — || March 10, 2000 || Kitt Peak || Spacewatch || — || align=right data-sort-value="0.76" | 760 m || 
|-id=240 bgcolor=#E9E9E9
| 399240 ||  || — || May 30, 2006 || Mount Lemmon || Mount Lemmon Survey || — || align=right data-sort-value="0.98" | 980 m || 
|-id=241 bgcolor=#E9E9E9
| 399241 ||  || — || May 3, 2006 || Kitt Peak || Spacewatch || — || align=right | 1.1 km || 
|-id=242 bgcolor=#fefefe
| 399242 ||  || — || March 12, 2010 || Mount Lemmon || Mount Lemmon Survey || — || align=right | 1.2 km || 
|-id=243 bgcolor=#fefefe
| 399243 ||  || — || December 1, 2005 || Mount Lemmon || Mount Lemmon Survey || NYS || align=right data-sort-value="0.67" | 670 m || 
|-id=244 bgcolor=#fefefe
| 399244 ||  || — || April 12, 1999 || Kitt Peak || Spacewatch || — || align=right data-sort-value="0.87" | 870 m || 
|-id=245 bgcolor=#d6d6d6
| 399245 ||  || — || October 19, 2007 || Mount Lemmon || Mount Lemmon Survey || — || align=right | 2.4 km || 
|-id=246 bgcolor=#fefefe
| 399246 ||  || — || May 11, 2007 || Mount Lemmon || Mount Lemmon Survey || NYS || align=right data-sort-value="0.60" | 600 m || 
|-id=247 bgcolor=#fefefe
| 399247 ||  || — || November 6, 2005 || Mount Lemmon || Mount Lemmon Survey || — || align=right data-sort-value="0.62" | 620 m || 
|-id=248 bgcolor=#d6d6d6
| 399248 ||  || — || February 24, 2008 || Mount Lemmon || Mount Lemmon Survey || — || align=right | 2.2 km || 
|-id=249 bgcolor=#fefefe
| 399249 ||  || — || April 4, 2003 || Kitt Peak || Spacewatch || NYS || align=right data-sort-value="0.55" | 550 m || 
|-id=250 bgcolor=#d6d6d6
| 399250 ||  || — || October 8, 2005 || Kitt Peak || Spacewatch || — || align=right | 3.1 km || 
|-id=251 bgcolor=#fefefe
| 399251 ||  || — || December 22, 2005 || Kitt Peak || Spacewatch || — || align=right data-sort-value="0.78" | 780 m || 
|-id=252 bgcolor=#E9E9E9
| 399252 ||  || — || September 26, 2006 || Kitt Peak || Spacewatch || AEO || align=right | 1.3 km || 
|-id=253 bgcolor=#E9E9E9
| 399253 ||  || — || April 24, 2006 || Kitt Peak || Spacewatch || (5) || align=right data-sort-value="0.92" | 920 m || 
|-id=254 bgcolor=#fefefe
| 399254 ||  || — || February 12, 2004 || Kitt Peak || Spacewatch || — || align=right data-sort-value="0.66" | 660 m || 
|-id=255 bgcolor=#fefefe
| 399255 ||  || — || December 1, 2005 || Mount Lemmon || Mount Lemmon Survey || (5026) || align=right | 2.0 km || 
|-id=256 bgcolor=#E9E9E9
| 399256 ||  || — || May 8, 2010 || Mount Lemmon || Mount Lemmon Survey || — || align=right data-sort-value="0.82" | 820 m || 
|-id=257 bgcolor=#d6d6d6
| 399257 ||  || — || April 20, 2009 || Kitt Peak || Spacewatch || — || align=right | 3.4 km || 
|-id=258 bgcolor=#d6d6d6
| 399258 ||  || — || October 27, 2005 || Kitt Peak || Spacewatch || TIR || align=right | 3.4 km || 
|-id=259 bgcolor=#E9E9E9
| 399259 ||  || — || February 26, 2009 || Kitt Peak || Spacewatch || HOF || align=right | 2.8 km || 
|-id=260 bgcolor=#fefefe
| 399260 ||  || — || December 25, 2005 || Mount Lemmon || Mount Lemmon Survey || MAS || align=right data-sort-value="0.82" | 820 m || 
|-id=261 bgcolor=#d6d6d6
| 399261 ||  || — || April 29, 2003 || Kitt Peak || Spacewatch || EOS || align=right | 2.1 km || 
|-id=262 bgcolor=#fefefe
| 399262 ||  || — || April 24, 2007 || Kitt Peak || Spacewatch || V || align=right data-sort-value="0.74" | 740 m || 
|-id=263 bgcolor=#fefefe
| 399263 ||  || — || March 13, 2007 || Mount Lemmon || Mount Lemmon Survey || V || align=right data-sort-value="0.71" | 710 m || 
|-id=264 bgcolor=#d6d6d6
| 399264 ||  || — || February 12, 2008 || Kitt Peak || Spacewatch || — || align=right | 2.4 km || 
|-id=265 bgcolor=#d6d6d6
| 399265 ||  || — || June 19, 2010 || WISE || WISE || — || align=right | 3.0 km || 
|-id=266 bgcolor=#E9E9E9
| 399266 ||  || — || April 10, 2005 || Mount Lemmon || Mount Lemmon Survey || — || align=right | 2.0 km || 
|-id=267 bgcolor=#E9E9E9
| 399267 ||  || — || October 10, 2007 || Mount Lemmon || Mount Lemmon Survey || — || align=right | 1.5 km || 
|-id=268 bgcolor=#d6d6d6
| 399268 ||  || — || October 8, 2005 || Kitt Peak || Spacewatch || — || align=right | 2.7 km || 
|-id=269 bgcolor=#d6d6d6
| 399269 ||  || — || March 16, 2004 || Kitt Peak || Spacewatch || — || align=right | 2.2 km || 
|-id=270 bgcolor=#fefefe
| 399270 ||  || — || December 14, 2004 || Socorro || LINEAR || — || align=right | 1.2 km || 
|-id=271 bgcolor=#d6d6d6
| 399271 ||  || — || October 6, 2004 || Kitt Peak || Spacewatch || 7:4 || align=right | 3.5 km || 
|-id=272 bgcolor=#E9E9E9
| 399272 ||  || — || October 20, 2007 || Mount Lemmon || Mount Lemmon Survey || AGN || align=right data-sort-value="0.87" | 870 m || 
|-id=273 bgcolor=#d6d6d6
| 399273 ||  || — || November 16, 2006 || Kitt Peak || Spacewatch || — || align=right | 2.2 km || 
|-id=274 bgcolor=#d6d6d6
| 399274 ||  || — || October 2, 2006 || Mount Lemmon || Mount Lemmon Survey || — || align=right | 2.5 km || 
|-id=275 bgcolor=#E9E9E9
| 399275 ||  || — || September 28, 2006 || Kitt Peak || Spacewatch || AGN || align=right | 1.1 km || 
|-id=276 bgcolor=#E9E9E9
| 399276 ||  || — || May 10, 2005 || Kitt Peak || Spacewatch || AGN || align=right | 1.3 km || 
|-id=277 bgcolor=#fefefe
| 399277 ||  || — || June 16, 2007 || Kitt Peak || Spacewatch || — || align=right | 1.0 km || 
|-id=278 bgcolor=#fefefe
| 399278 ||  || — || November 5, 2005 || Catalina || CSS || — || align=right | 1.8 km || 
|-id=279 bgcolor=#E9E9E9
| 399279 ||  || — || February 19, 2001 || Kitt Peak || Spacewatch || — || align=right | 1.4 km || 
|-id=280 bgcolor=#E9E9E9
| 399280 ||  || — || February 19, 2009 || Mount Lemmon || Mount Lemmon Survey || GEF || align=right | 1.0 km || 
|-id=281 bgcolor=#d6d6d6
| 399281 ||  || — || December 1, 2006 || Mount Lemmon || Mount Lemmon Survey || — || align=right | 3.6 km || 
|-id=282 bgcolor=#fefefe
| 399282 ||  || — || October 12, 2004 || Anderson Mesa || LONEOS || H || align=right data-sort-value="0.52" | 520 m || 
|-id=283 bgcolor=#d6d6d6
| 399283 ||  || — || May 2, 2003 || Kitt Peak || Spacewatch || — || align=right | 5.0 km || 
|-id=284 bgcolor=#d6d6d6
| 399284 ||  || — || October 19, 2006 || Kitt Peak || Spacewatch || — || align=right | 2.7 km || 
|-id=285 bgcolor=#fefefe
| 399285 ||  || — || March 31, 2003 || Anderson Mesa || LONEOS || — || align=right data-sort-value="0.85" | 850 m || 
|-id=286 bgcolor=#fefefe
| 399286 ||  || — || January 22, 2006 || Mount Lemmon || Mount Lemmon Survey || MAS || align=right data-sort-value="0.64" | 640 m || 
|-id=287 bgcolor=#d6d6d6
| 399287 ||  || — || March 9, 2007 || Mount Lemmon || Mount Lemmon Survey || — || align=right | 2.8 km || 
|-id=288 bgcolor=#fefefe
| 399288 ||  || — || April 18, 2007 || Kitt Peak || Spacewatch || — || align=right data-sort-value="0.69" | 690 m || 
|-id=289 bgcolor=#fefefe
| 399289 ||  || — || March 13, 2007 || Mount Lemmon || Mount Lemmon Survey || — || align=right data-sort-value="0.84" | 840 m || 
|-id=290 bgcolor=#fefefe
| 399290 ||  || — || December 3, 2008 || Mount Lemmon || Mount Lemmon Survey || — || align=right | 1.0 km || 
|-id=291 bgcolor=#fefefe
| 399291 ||  || — || October 28, 2005 || Kitt Peak || Spacewatch || — || align=right data-sort-value="0.74" | 740 m || 
|-id=292 bgcolor=#fefefe
| 399292 ||  || — || April 24, 2007 || Kitt Peak || Spacewatch || — || align=right data-sort-value="0.55" | 550 m || 
|-id=293 bgcolor=#d6d6d6
| 399293 ||  || — || April 23, 2010 || WISE || WISE || — || align=right | 3.6 km || 
|-id=294 bgcolor=#fefefe
| 399294 ||  || — || October 29, 2005 || Mount Lemmon || Mount Lemmon Survey || — || align=right data-sort-value="0.68" | 680 m || 
|-id=295 bgcolor=#fefefe
| 399295 ||  || — || October 24, 2005 || Kitt Peak || Spacewatch || — || align=right data-sort-value="0.58" | 580 m || 
|-id=296 bgcolor=#fefefe
| 399296 ||  || — || August 10, 2004 || Socorro || LINEAR || — || align=right data-sort-value="0.72" | 720 m || 
|-id=297 bgcolor=#fefefe
| 399297 ||  || — || April 30, 2004 || Kitt Peak || Spacewatch || — || align=right data-sort-value="0.73" | 730 m || 
|-id=298 bgcolor=#d6d6d6
| 399298 ||  || — || November 4, 2005 || Mount Lemmon || Mount Lemmon Survey || — || align=right | 2.6 km || 
|-id=299 bgcolor=#E9E9E9
| 399299 ||  || — || November 21, 2008 || Kitt Peak || Spacewatch || — || align=right | 2.6 km || 
|-id=300 bgcolor=#E9E9E9
| 399300 ||  || — || September 30, 1997 || Kitt Peak || Spacewatch || — || align=right | 1.9 km || 
|}

399301–399400 

|-bgcolor=#fefefe
| 399301 ||  || — || October 6, 2005 || Kitt Peak || Spacewatch || — || align=right data-sort-value="0.74" | 740 m || 
|-id=302 bgcolor=#E9E9E9
| 399302 ||  || — || December 15, 1999 || Kitt Peak || Spacewatch || — || align=right | 1.7 km || 
|-id=303 bgcolor=#fefefe
| 399303 ||  || — || March 18, 2004 || Kitt Peak || Spacewatch || — || align=right data-sort-value="0.71" | 710 m || 
|-id=304 bgcolor=#E9E9E9
| 399304 ||  || — || September 19, 1995 || Kitt Peak || Spacewatch || (5) || align=right | 1.2 km || 
|-id=305 bgcolor=#fefefe
| 399305 || 2014 JR || — || March 23, 2003 || Kitt Peak || Spacewatch || — || align=right data-sort-value="0.89" | 890 m || 
|-id=306 bgcolor=#fefefe
| 399306 || 5400 T-3 || — || October 16, 1977 || Palomar || PLS || — || align=right data-sort-value="0.75" | 750 m || 
|-id=307 bgcolor=#FFC2E0
| 399307 ||  || — || September 8, 1991 || Palomar || E. F. Helin || AMOmoon || align=right data-sort-value="0.59" | 590 m || 
|-id=308 bgcolor=#FFC2E0
| 399308 || 1993 GD || — || April 15, 1993 || Kitt Peak || Spacewatch || APO || align=right data-sort-value="0.27" | 270 m || 
|-id=309 bgcolor=#d6d6d6
| 399309 ||  || — || October 28, 1994 || Kitt Peak || Spacewatch || critical || align=right | 2.2 km || 
|-id=310 bgcolor=#fefefe
| 399310 || 1994 XB || — || December 1, 1994 || Kitt Peak || Spacewatch || — || align=right data-sort-value="0.65" | 650 m || 
|-id=311 bgcolor=#fefefe
| 399311 ||  || — || December 2, 1994 || Kitt Peak || Spacewatch || — || align=right data-sort-value="0.71" | 710 m || 
|-id=312 bgcolor=#d6d6d6
| 399312 ||  || — || October 17, 1995 || Kitt Peak || Spacewatch || — || align=right | 1.8 km || 
|-id=313 bgcolor=#E9E9E9
| 399313 ||  || — || October 20, 1995 || Kitt Peak || Spacewatch || — || align=right data-sort-value="0.97" | 970 m || 
|-id=314 bgcolor=#E9E9E9
| 399314 ||  || — || September 10, 1996 || Kuma Kogen || A. Nakamura || — || align=right | 2.4 km || 
|-id=315 bgcolor=#fefefe
| 399315 ||  || — || October 6, 1996 || Kitt Peak || Spacewatch || — || align=right data-sort-value="0.86" | 860 m || 
|-id=316 bgcolor=#fefefe
| 399316 ||  || — || December 7, 1996 || Kitt Peak || Spacewatch || MAS || align=right data-sort-value="0.83" | 830 m || 
|-id=317 bgcolor=#E9E9E9
| 399317 ||  || — || March 7, 1997 || Kitt Peak || Spacewatch || — || align=right data-sort-value="0.82" | 820 m || 
|-id=318 bgcolor=#fefefe
| 399318 ||  || — || December 4, 1997 || Dynic || A. Sugie || — || align=right | 1.5 km || 
|-id=319 bgcolor=#fefefe
| 399319 ||  || — || December 31, 1997 || Oizumi || T. Kobayashi || PHO || align=right | 1.5 km || 
|-id=320 bgcolor=#d6d6d6
| 399320 ||  || — || June 27, 1998 || Kitt Peak || Spacewatch || — || align=right | 3.4 km || 
|-id=321 bgcolor=#E9E9E9
| 399321 ||  || — || August 17, 1998 || Socorro || LINEAR || — || align=right | 1.1 km || 
|-id=322 bgcolor=#d6d6d6
| 399322 ||  || — || August 31, 1998 || Xinglong || SCAP || — || align=right | 5.4 km || 
|-id=323 bgcolor=#d6d6d6
| 399323 ||  || — || September 18, 1998 || Catalina || CSS || — || align=right | 2.8 km || 
|-id=324 bgcolor=#d6d6d6
| 399324 ||  || — || November 14, 1998 || Kitt Peak || Spacewatch || — || align=right | 2.9 km || 
|-id=325 bgcolor=#FFC2E0
| 399325 ||  || — || April 14, 1999 || Socorro || LINEAR || APO || align=right data-sort-value="0.67" | 670 m || 
|-id=326 bgcolor=#fefefe
| 399326 ||  || — || September 9, 1999 || Socorro || LINEAR || — || align=right | 1.1 km || 
|-id=327 bgcolor=#d6d6d6
| 399327 ||  || — || October 6, 1999 || Kitt Peak || Spacewatch || — || align=right | 2.7 km || 
|-id=328 bgcolor=#fefefe
| 399328 ||  || — || October 11, 1999 || Socorro || LINEAR || NYS || align=right data-sort-value="0.87" | 870 m || 
|-id=329 bgcolor=#d6d6d6
| 399329 ||  || — || October 5, 1999 || Anderson Mesa || LONEOS || — || align=right | 3.5 km || 
|-id=330 bgcolor=#d6d6d6
| 399330 ||  || — || October 4, 1999 || Catalina || CSS || Tj (2.93) || align=right | 4.6 km || 
|-id=331 bgcolor=#d6d6d6
| 399331 ||  || — || October 6, 1999 || Kitt Peak || Spacewatch || — || align=right | 3.3 km || 
|-id=332 bgcolor=#d6d6d6
| 399332 ||  || — || October 30, 1999 || Kitt Peak || Spacewatch || — || align=right | 2.5 km || 
|-id=333 bgcolor=#d6d6d6
| 399333 ||  || — || October 10, 1999 || Socorro || LINEAR || — || align=right | 3.2 km || 
|-id=334 bgcolor=#fefefe
| 399334 ||  || — || December 7, 1999 || Socorro || LINEAR || — || align=right | 1.3 km || 
|-id=335 bgcolor=#fefefe
| 399335 ||  || — || December 8, 1999 || Socorro || LINEAR || — || align=right | 1.2 km || 
|-id=336 bgcolor=#d6d6d6
| 399336 ||  || — || December 18, 1999 || Kitt Peak || Spacewatch || TIR || align=right | 3.5 km || 
|-id=337 bgcolor=#fefefe
| 399337 ||  || — || February 4, 2000 || Višnjan Observatory || K. Korlević || H || align=right data-sort-value="0.91" | 910 m || 
|-id=338 bgcolor=#E9E9E9
| 399338 ||  || — || February 5, 2000 || Kitt Peak || M. W. Buie || — || align=right | 1.4 km || 
|-id=339 bgcolor=#fefefe
| 399339 ||  || — || May 6, 2000 || Socorro || LINEAR || H || align=right data-sort-value="0.88" | 880 m || 
|-id=340 bgcolor=#FA8072
| 399340 ||  || — || June 1, 2000 || Haleakala || NEAT || — || align=right | 1.9 km || 
|-id=341 bgcolor=#fefefe
| 399341 ||  || — || August 21, 2000 || Anderson Mesa || LONEOS || — || align=right data-sort-value="0.92" | 920 m || 
|-id=342 bgcolor=#fefefe
| 399342 ||  || — || August 21, 2000 || Anderson Mesa || LONEOS || — || align=right data-sort-value="0.79" | 790 m || 
|-id=343 bgcolor=#fefefe
| 399343 ||  || — || September 3, 2000 || Socorro || LINEAR || V || align=right data-sort-value="0.74" | 740 m || 
|-id=344 bgcolor=#E9E9E9
| 399344 ||  || — || September 23, 2000 || Socorro || LINEAR || — || align=right | 3.0 km || 
|-id=345 bgcolor=#fefefe
| 399345 ||  || — || September 24, 2000 || Socorro || LINEAR || — || align=right | 1.2 km || 
|-id=346 bgcolor=#fefefe
| 399346 ||  || — || September 23, 2000 || Socorro || LINEAR || — || align=right | 1.0 km || 
|-id=347 bgcolor=#fefefe
| 399347 ||  || — || September 24, 2000 || Socorro || LINEAR || — || align=right data-sort-value="0.96" | 960 m || 
|-id=348 bgcolor=#fefefe
| 399348 ||  || — || September 19, 2000 || Kitt Peak || Spacewatch || — || align=right data-sort-value="0.67" | 670 m || 
|-id=349 bgcolor=#fefefe
| 399349 ||  || — || September 27, 2000 || Socorro || LINEAR || — || align=right data-sort-value="0.78" | 780 m || 
|-id=350 bgcolor=#fefefe
| 399350 ||  || — || September 28, 2000 || Socorro || LINEAR || — || align=right data-sort-value="0.98" | 980 m || 
|-id=351 bgcolor=#fefefe
| 399351 ||  || — || September 26, 2000 || Anderson Mesa || LONEOS || — || align=right data-sort-value="0.96" | 960 m || 
|-id=352 bgcolor=#d6d6d6
| 399352 ||  || — || September 30, 2000 || Kitt Peak || Spacewatch || TEL || align=right | 1.2 km || 
|-id=353 bgcolor=#fefefe
| 399353 ||  || — || September 27, 2000 || Kitt Peak || Spacewatch || NYS || align=right data-sort-value="0.59" | 590 m || 
|-id=354 bgcolor=#fefefe
| 399354 ||  || — || October 24, 2000 || Socorro || LINEAR || ERI || align=right | 1.7 km || 
|-id=355 bgcolor=#fefefe
| 399355 ||  || — || October 25, 2000 || Socorro || LINEAR || — || align=right data-sort-value="0.96" | 960 m || 
|-id=356 bgcolor=#FA8072
| 399356 ||  || — || November 24, 2000 || Kitt Peak || Spacewatch || — || align=right | 1.0 km || 
|-id=357 bgcolor=#fefefe
| 399357 ||  || — || November 19, 2000 || Kitt Peak || Spacewatch || — || align=right data-sort-value="0.98" | 980 m || 
|-id=358 bgcolor=#fefefe
| 399358 ||  || — || November 20, 2000 || Socorro || LINEAR || — || align=right | 1.1 km || 
|-id=359 bgcolor=#d6d6d6
| 399359 ||  || — || November 30, 2000 || Socorro || LINEAR || — || align=right | 4.0 km || 
|-id=360 bgcolor=#fefefe
| 399360 ||  || — || December 2, 2000 || Haleakala || NEAT || — || align=right | 1.0 km || 
|-id=361 bgcolor=#E9E9E9
| 399361 ||  || — || January 19, 2001 || Haleakala || NEAT || EUN || align=right | 1.5 km || 
|-id=362 bgcolor=#E9E9E9
| 399362 ||  || — || April 21, 2001 || Socorro || LINEAR || — || align=right | 3.4 km || 
|-id=363 bgcolor=#E9E9E9
| 399363 ||  || — || April 24, 2001 || Anderson Mesa || LONEOS || JUN || align=right | 1.4 km || 
|-id=364 bgcolor=#E9E9E9
| 399364 ||  || — || May 17, 2001 || Socorro || LINEAR || — || align=right | 2.3 km || 
|-id=365 bgcolor=#E9E9E9
| 399365 ||  || — || July 11, 2001 || Palomar || NEAT || BAR || align=right | 1.5 km || 
|-id=366 bgcolor=#E9E9E9
| 399366 ||  || — || July 20, 2001 || Anderson Mesa || LONEOS || — || align=right | 2.5 km || 
|-id=367 bgcolor=#E9E9E9
| 399367 ||  || — || July 16, 2001 || Anderson Mesa || LONEOS || — || align=right | 2.1 km || 
|-id=368 bgcolor=#E9E9E9
| 399368 ||  || — || August 11, 2001 || Palomar || NEAT || EUN || align=right | 1.2 km || 
|-id=369 bgcolor=#E9E9E9
| 399369 ||  || — || August 14, 2001 || Haleakala || NEAT || — || align=right | 1.7 km || 
|-id=370 bgcolor=#E9E9E9
| 399370 ||  || — || August 16, 2001 || Socorro || LINEAR || JUNcritical || align=right | 1.4 km || 
|-id=371 bgcolor=#E9E9E9
| 399371 ||  || — || August 17, 2001 || Socorro || LINEAR || — || align=right | 1.4 km || 
|-id=372 bgcolor=#E9E9E9
| 399372 ||  || — || August 23, 2001 || Anderson Mesa || LONEOS || — || align=right | 2.4 km || 
|-id=373 bgcolor=#E9E9E9
| 399373 ||  || — || August 22, 2001 || Socorro || LINEAR || JUN || align=right data-sort-value="0.92" | 920 m || 
|-id=374 bgcolor=#E9E9E9
| 399374 ||  || — || August 22, 2001 || Socorro || LINEAR || JUN || align=right | 1.5 km || 
|-id=375 bgcolor=#E9E9E9
| 399375 ||  || — || August 22, 2001 || Socorro || LINEAR || JUN || align=right | 1.5 km || 
|-id=376 bgcolor=#E9E9E9
| 399376 ||  || — || August 22, 2001 || Socorro || LINEAR || — || align=right | 1.6 km || 
|-id=377 bgcolor=#E9E9E9
| 399377 ||  || — || August 22, 2001 || Socorro || LINEAR || — || align=right | 2.0 km || 
|-id=378 bgcolor=#E9E9E9
| 399378 ||  || — || August 24, 2001 || Socorro || LINEAR || — || align=right | 1.7 km || 
|-id=379 bgcolor=#fefefe
| 399379 ||  || — || August 27, 2001 || Kitt Peak || Spacewatch || — || align=right data-sort-value="0.67" | 670 m || 
|-id=380 bgcolor=#fefefe
| 399380 ||  || — || September 11, 2001 || Socorro || LINEAR || H || align=right data-sort-value="0.72" | 720 m || 
|-id=381 bgcolor=#E9E9E9
| 399381 ||  || — || September 7, 2001 || Socorro || LINEAR || JUN || align=right | 1.2 km || 
|-id=382 bgcolor=#fefefe
| 399382 ||  || — || September 8, 2001 || Socorro || LINEAR || — || align=right data-sort-value="0.64" | 640 m || 
|-id=383 bgcolor=#E9E9E9
| 399383 ||  || — || November 1, 1997 || Kitt Peak || Spacewatch || LEO || align=right | 1.8 km || 
|-id=384 bgcolor=#E9E9E9
| 399384 ||  || — || September 12, 2001 || Socorro || LINEAR || — || align=right | 1.5 km || 
|-id=385 bgcolor=#fefefe
| 399385 ||  || — || September 16, 2001 || Socorro || LINEAR || — || align=right data-sort-value="0.74" | 740 m || 
|-id=386 bgcolor=#E9E9E9
| 399386 ||  || — || September 16, 2001 || Socorro || LINEAR || — || align=right | 2.1 km || 
|-id=387 bgcolor=#E9E9E9
| 399387 ||  || — || September 16, 2001 || Socorro || LINEAR || AGN || align=right | 1.4 km || 
|-id=388 bgcolor=#fefefe
| 399388 ||  || — || September 20, 2001 || Socorro || LINEAR || — || align=right data-sort-value="0.74" | 740 m || 
|-id=389 bgcolor=#E9E9E9
| 399389 ||  || — || September 16, 2001 || Socorro || LINEAR || — || align=right | 1.6 km || 
|-id=390 bgcolor=#E9E9E9
| 399390 ||  || — || September 19, 2001 || Socorro || LINEAR || — || align=right | 2.3 km || 
|-id=391 bgcolor=#E9E9E9
| 399391 ||  || — || September 19, 2001 || Socorro || LINEAR || — || align=right | 1.1 km || 
|-id=392 bgcolor=#fefefe
| 399392 ||  || — || September 19, 2001 || Socorro || LINEAR || — || align=right data-sort-value="0.59" | 590 m || 
|-id=393 bgcolor=#fefefe
| 399393 ||  || — || September 19, 2001 || Socorro || LINEAR || — || align=right data-sort-value="0.61" | 610 m || 
|-id=394 bgcolor=#E9E9E9
| 399394 ||  || — || September 29, 2001 || Emerald Lane || L. Ball || DOR || align=right | 2.2 km || 
|-id=395 bgcolor=#E9E9E9
| 399395 ||  || — || September 29, 2001 || Palomar || NEAT || — || align=right | 3.3 km || 
|-id=396 bgcolor=#fefefe
| 399396 ||  || — || September 10, 2001 || Socorro || LINEAR || — || align=right data-sort-value="0.78" | 780 m || 
|-id=397 bgcolor=#E9E9E9
| 399397 ||  || — || September 20, 2001 || Socorro || LINEAR || — || align=right | 2.6 km || 
|-id=398 bgcolor=#fefefe
| 399398 ||  || — || September 12, 2001 || Socorro || LINEAR || — || align=right data-sort-value="0.62" | 620 m || 
|-id=399 bgcolor=#E9E9E9
| 399399 ||  || — || September 25, 2001 || Socorro || LINEAR || — || align=right | 2.8 km || 
|-id=400 bgcolor=#E9E9E9
| 399400 ||  || — || September 21, 2001 || Palomar || NEAT || — || align=right | 2.0 km || 
|}

399401–399500 

|-bgcolor=#FA8072
| 399401 ||  || — || September 21, 2001 || Palomar || NEAT || — || align=right | 2.9 km || 
|-id=402 bgcolor=#fefefe
| 399402 ||  || — || September 23, 2001 || Haleakala || NEAT || — || align=right data-sort-value="0.91" | 910 m || 
|-id=403 bgcolor=#E9E9E9
| 399403 || 2001 TS || — || October 8, 2001 || Palomar || NEAT || — || align=right | 4.2 km || 
|-id=404 bgcolor=#FA8072
| 399404 ||  || — || October 14, 2001 || Socorro || LINEAR || — || align=right data-sort-value="0.68" | 680 m || 
|-id=405 bgcolor=#fefefe
| 399405 ||  || — || October 13, 2001 || Socorro || LINEAR || — || align=right data-sort-value="0.99" | 990 m || 
|-id=406 bgcolor=#fefefe
| 399406 ||  || — || October 14, 2001 || Socorro || LINEAR || — || align=right data-sort-value="0.88" | 880 m || 
|-id=407 bgcolor=#E9E9E9
| 399407 ||  || — || October 12, 2001 || Haleakala || NEAT || — || align=right | 2.2 km || 
|-id=408 bgcolor=#fefefe
| 399408 ||  || — || October 10, 2001 || Palomar || NEAT || — || align=right data-sort-value="0.73" | 730 m || 
|-id=409 bgcolor=#E9E9E9
| 399409 ||  || — || September 20, 2001 || Socorro || LINEAR || — || align=right | 1.5 km || 
|-id=410 bgcolor=#E9E9E9
| 399410 ||  || — || October 11, 2001 || Socorro || LINEAR || — || align=right | 1.8 km || 
|-id=411 bgcolor=#fefefe
| 399411 ||  || — || October 10, 2001 || Palomar || NEAT || — || align=right data-sort-value="0.72" | 720 m || 
|-id=412 bgcolor=#fefefe
| 399412 ||  || — || October 14, 2001 || Apache Point || SDSS || — || align=right data-sort-value="0.67" | 670 m || 
|-id=413 bgcolor=#fefefe
| 399413 ||  || — || October 17, 2001 || Socorro || LINEAR || — || align=right data-sort-value="0.90" | 900 m || 
|-id=414 bgcolor=#fefefe
| 399414 ||  || — || October 25, 2001 || Kitt Peak || Spacewatch || — || align=right data-sort-value="0.60" | 600 m || 
|-id=415 bgcolor=#E9E9E9
| 399415 ||  || — || October 19, 2001 || Anderson Mesa || LONEOS || — || align=right | 2.4 km || 
|-id=416 bgcolor=#E9E9E9
| 399416 ||  || — || October 21, 2001 || Socorro || LINEAR || — || align=right | 2.3 km || 
|-id=417 bgcolor=#E9E9E9
| 399417 ||  || — || November 9, 2001 || Socorro || LINEAR || — || align=right | 2.2 km || 
|-id=418 bgcolor=#E9E9E9
| 399418 ||  || — || November 12, 2001 || Haleakala || NEAT || — || align=right | 2.3 km || 
|-id=419 bgcolor=#E9E9E9
| 399419 ||  || — || November 12, 2001 || Socorro || LINEAR || — || align=right | 2.5 km || 
|-id=420 bgcolor=#E9E9E9
| 399420 ||  || — || November 19, 2001 || Socorro || LINEAR || — || align=right | 1.6 km || 
|-id=421 bgcolor=#fefefe
| 399421 ||  || — || November 21, 2001 || Socorro || LINEAR || — || align=right data-sort-value="0.63" | 630 m || 
|-id=422 bgcolor=#E9E9E9
| 399422 ||  || — || November 21, 2001 || Haleakala || NEAT || — || align=right | 2.6 km || 
|-id=423 bgcolor=#fefefe
| 399423 ||  || — || December 9, 2001 || Socorro || LINEAR || H || align=right data-sort-value="0.92" | 920 m || 
|-id=424 bgcolor=#E9E9E9
| 399424 ||  || — || December 10, 2001 || Socorro || LINEAR || TIN || align=right | 2.0 km || 
|-id=425 bgcolor=#fefefe
| 399425 ||  || — || December 11, 2001 || Socorro || LINEAR || H || align=right data-sort-value="0.97" | 970 m || 
|-id=426 bgcolor=#fefefe
| 399426 ||  || — || December 14, 2001 || Socorro || LINEAR || — || align=right data-sort-value="0.84" | 840 m || 
|-id=427 bgcolor=#fefefe
| 399427 ||  || — || December 14, 2001 || Socorro || LINEAR || — || align=right | 1.1 km || 
|-id=428 bgcolor=#E9E9E9
| 399428 ||  || — || December 14, 2001 || Socorro || LINEAR || — || align=right | 2.7 km || 
|-id=429 bgcolor=#E9E9E9
| 399429 ||  || — || December 11, 2001 || Socorro || LINEAR || — || align=right | 2.5 km || 
|-id=430 bgcolor=#fefefe
| 399430 ||  || — || November 24, 2001 || Socorro || LINEAR || H || align=right data-sort-value="0.84" | 840 m || 
|-id=431 bgcolor=#E9E9E9
| 399431 ||  || — || November 12, 2001 || Socorro || LINEAR || GEF || align=right | 1.3 km || 
|-id=432 bgcolor=#fefefe
| 399432 ||  || — || November 20, 2001 || Socorro || LINEAR || H || align=right | 1.00 km || 
|-id=433 bgcolor=#FFC2E0
| 399433 ||  || — || December 23, 2001 || Anderson Mesa || LONEOS || APOcritical || align=right | 1.3 km || 
|-id=434 bgcolor=#E9E9E9
| 399434 ||  || — || December 18, 2001 || Socorro || LINEAR || — || align=right | 4.7 km || 
|-id=435 bgcolor=#fefefe
| 399435 ||  || — || December 9, 2001 || Socorro || LINEAR || — || align=right | 1.0 km || 
|-id=436 bgcolor=#E9E9E9
| 399436 ||  || — || January 9, 2002 || Socorro || LINEAR || — || align=right | 3.3 km || 
|-id=437 bgcolor=#fefefe
| 399437 ||  || — || January 14, 2002 || Socorro || LINEAR || H || align=right data-sort-value="0.83" | 830 m || 
|-id=438 bgcolor=#fefefe
| 399438 ||  || — || January 8, 2002 || Socorro || LINEAR || H || align=right data-sort-value="0.97" | 970 m || 
|-id=439 bgcolor=#d6d6d6
| 399439 ||  || — || January 9, 2002 || Socorro || LINEAR || — || align=right | 3.4 km || 
|-id=440 bgcolor=#d6d6d6
| 399440 ||  || — || January 13, 2002 || Apache Point || SDSS || — || align=right | 3.4 km || 
|-id=441 bgcolor=#FA8072
| 399441 ||  || — || January 9, 2002 || Kitt Peak || Spacewatch || — || align=right data-sort-value="0.98" | 980 m || 
|-id=442 bgcolor=#d6d6d6
| 399442 ||  || — || February 2, 2002 || Cima Ekar || ADAS || — || align=right | 3.1 km || 
|-id=443 bgcolor=#fefefe
| 399443 ||  || — || March 9, 2002 || Palomar || NEAT || — || align=right data-sort-value="0.87" | 870 m || 
|-id=444 bgcolor=#d6d6d6
| 399444 ||  || — || March 5, 2002 || Apache Point || SDSS || — || align=right | 2.6 km || 
|-id=445 bgcolor=#fefefe
| 399445 ||  || — || March 17, 2002 || Kitt Peak || Spacewatch || — || align=right data-sort-value="0.91" | 910 m || 
|-id=446 bgcolor=#FFC2E0
| 399446 ||  || — || April 2, 2002 || Palomar || NEAT || AMO || align=right data-sort-value="0.29" | 290 m || 
|-id=447 bgcolor=#E9E9E9
| 399447 ||  || — || April 9, 2002 || Kitt Peak || Spacewatch || — || align=right | 1.2 km || 
|-id=448 bgcolor=#fefefe
| 399448 ||  || — || April 14, 2002 || Socorro || LINEAR || — || align=right data-sort-value="0.64" | 640 m || 
|-id=449 bgcolor=#fefefe
| 399449 ||  || — || April 14, 2002 || Palomar || NEAT || MAS || align=right data-sort-value="0.73" | 730 m || 
|-id=450 bgcolor=#d6d6d6
| 399450 ||  || — || April 22, 2002 || Anderson Mesa || LONEOS || EUP || align=right | 3.6 km || 
|-id=451 bgcolor=#d6d6d6
| 399451 ||  || — || May 6, 2002 || Socorro || LINEAR || — || align=right | 4.1 km || 
|-id=452 bgcolor=#fefefe
| 399452 ||  || — || April 14, 2002 || Socorro || LINEAR || — || align=right | 1.2 km || 
|-id=453 bgcolor=#E9E9E9
| 399453 ||  || — || July 6, 2002 || Palomar || NEAT || — || align=right | 1.1 km || 
|-id=454 bgcolor=#E9E9E9
| 399454 ||  || — || July 18, 2002 || Socorro || LINEAR || — || align=right | 1.2 km || 
|-id=455 bgcolor=#E9E9E9
| 399455 ||  || — || July 19, 2002 || Palomar || NEAT || (5) || align=right data-sort-value="0.94" | 940 m || 
|-id=456 bgcolor=#E9E9E9
| 399456 ||  || — || July 14, 2002 || Socorro || LINEAR || (5) || align=right data-sort-value="0.95" | 950 m || 
|-id=457 bgcolor=#FFC2E0
| 399457 ||  || — || August 7, 2002 || Palomar || NEAT || APOPHA || align=right data-sort-value="0.54" | 540 m || 
|-id=458 bgcolor=#E9E9E9
| 399458 ||  || — || August 4, 2002 || Palomar || NEAT || EUN || align=right | 1.3 km || 
|-id=459 bgcolor=#E9E9E9
| 399459 ||  || — || August 12, 2002 || Socorro || LINEAR || — || align=right | 1.5 km || 
|-id=460 bgcolor=#d6d6d6
| 399460 ||  || — || August 8, 2002 || Palomar || NEAT || 7:4 || align=right | 3.5 km || 
|-id=461 bgcolor=#E9E9E9
| 399461 ||  || — || August 8, 2002 || Palomar || NEAT || — || align=right | 1.3 km || 
|-id=462 bgcolor=#E9E9E9
| 399462 ||  || — || August 15, 2002 || Palomar || NEAT || — || align=right | 1.1 km || 
|-id=463 bgcolor=#d6d6d6
| 399463 ||  || — || August 7, 2002 || Palomar || NEAT || — || align=right | 3.4 km || 
|-id=464 bgcolor=#FA8072
| 399464 ||  || — || August 30, 2002 || Socorro || LINEAR || — || align=right data-sort-value="0.86" | 860 m || 
|-id=465 bgcolor=#E9E9E9
| 399465 ||  || — || August 19, 2002 || Palomar || NEAT || EUN || align=right data-sort-value="0.88" | 880 m || 
|-id=466 bgcolor=#E9E9E9
| 399466 ||  || — || August 17, 2002 || Palomar || NEAT || — || align=right | 1.1 km || 
|-id=467 bgcolor=#E9E9E9
| 399467 ||  || — || August 27, 2002 || Palomar || NEAT || — || align=right | 1.9 km || 
|-id=468 bgcolor=#E9E9E9
| 399468 ||  || — || August 28, 2002 || Palomar || NEAT || (5) || align=right data-sort-value="0.89" | 890 m || 
|-id=469 bgcolor=#E9E9E9
| 399469 ||  || — || August 20, 2002 || Palomar || NEAT || — || align=right | 1.0 km || 
|-id=470 bgcolor=#E9E9E9
| 399470 ||  || — || August 15, 2002 || Socorro || LINEAR || — || align=right | 1.1 km || 
|-id=471 bgcolor=#E9E9E9
| 399471 ||  || — || September 3, 2002 || Palomar || NEAT || EUN || align=right | 1.5 km || 
|-id=472 bgcolor=#E9E9E9
| 399472 ||  || — || September 11, 2002 || Haleakala || NEAT || — || align=right data-sort-value="0.91" | 910 m || 
|-id=473 bgcolor=#E9E9E9
| 399473 ||  || — || September 13, 2002 || Palomar || NEAT || — || align=right data-sort-value="0.99" | 990 m || 
|-id=474 bgcolor=#E9E9E9
| 399474 ||  || — || September 13, 2002 || Palomar || NEAT || critical || align=right data-sort-value="0.90" | 900 m || 
|-id=475 bgcolor=#E9E9E9
| 399475 ||  || — || September 11, 2002 || Haleakala || NEAT || — || align=right data-sort-value="0.83" | 830 m || 
|-id=476 bgcolor=#E9E9E9
| 399476 ||  || — || September 13, 2002 || Palomar || NEAT || — || align=right | 1.0 km || 
|-id=477 bgcolor=#E9E9E9
| 399477 ||  || — || September 15, 2002 || Palomar || NEAT || (5) || align=right data-sort-value="0.77" | 770 m || 
|-id=478 bgcolor=#E9E9E9
| 399478 ||  || — || September 3, 2002 || Palomar || NEAT || — || align=right data-sort-value="0.96" | 960 m || 
|-id=479 bgcolor=#E9E9E9
| 399479 ||  || — || September 4, 2002 || Palomar || NEAT || — || align=right | 1.8 km || 
|-id=480 bgcolor=#E9E9E9
| 399480 ||  || — || September 14, 2002 || Palomar || NEAT || — || align=right | 1.3 km || 
|-id=481 bgcolor=#E9E9E9
| 399481 ||  || — || September 27, 2002 || Palomar || NEAT || — || align=right | 1.7 km || 
|-id=482 bgcolor=#E9E9E9
| 399482 ||  || — || September 27, 2002 || Palomar || NEAT || EUN || align=right | 1.6 km || 
|-id=483 bgcolor=#E9E9E9
| 399483 ||  || — || September 28, 2002 || Palomar || NEAT || — || align=right data-sort-value="0.86" | 860 m || 
|-id=484 bgcolor=#E9E9E9
| 399484 ||  || — || September 17, 2002 || Palomar || NEAT || — || align=right data-sort-value="0.71" | 710 m || 
|-id=485 bgcolor=#E9E9E9
| 399485 ||  || — || October 1, 2002 || Anderson Mesa || LONEOS || — || align=right | 1.4 km || 
|-id=486 bgcolor=#E9E9E9
| 399486 ||  || — || October 2, 2002 || Socorro || LINEAR || — || align=right data-sort-value="0.90" | 900 m || 
|-id=487 bgcolor=#E9E9E9
| 399487 ||  || — || October 2, 2002 || Socorro || LINEAR || (5) || align=right data-sort-value="0.85" | 850 m || 
|-id=488 bgcolor=#FA8072
| 399488 ||  || — || October 2, 2002 || Socorro || LINEAR || — || align=right | 1.1 km || 
|-id=489 bgcolor=#E9E9E9
| 399489 ||  || — || October 2, 2002 || Haleakala || NEAT || — || align=right | 2.1 km || 
|-id=490 bgcolor=#E9E9E9
| 399490 ||  || — || October 4, 2002 || Anderson Mesa || LONEOS || — || align=right data-sort-value="0.94" | 940 m || 
|-id=491 bgcolor=#E9E9E9
| 399491 ||  || — || October 4, 2002 || Anderson Mesa || LONEOS || — || align=right | 2.0 km || 
|-id=492 bgcolor=#E9E9E9
| 399492 ||  || — || October 4, 2002 || Socorro || LINEAR || — || align=right data-sort-value="0.85" | 850 m || 
|-id=493 bgcolor=#E9E9E9
| 399493 ||  || — || October 5, 2002 || Palomar || NEAT || — || align=right | 2.7 km || 
|-id=494 bgcolor=#E9E9E9
| 399494 ||  || — || October 2, 2002 || Haleakala || NEAT || — || align=right | 1.1 km || 
|-id=495 bgcolor=#E9E9E9
| 399495 ||  || — || October 4, 2002 || Socorro || LINEAR || — || align=right | 1.7 km || 
|-id=496 bgcolor=#E9E9E9
| 399496 ||  || — || October 14, 2002 || Palomar || NEAT || BAR || align=right | 1.6 km || 
|-id=497 bgcolor=#E9E9E9
| 399497 ||  || — || October 1, 2002 || Socorro || LINEAR || MAR || align=right | 1.5 km || 
|-id=498 bgcolor=#E9E9E9
| 399498 ||  || — || October 4, 2002 || Socorro || LINEAR || — || align=right data-sort-value="0.75" | 750 m || 
|-id=499 bgcolor=#E9E9E9
| 399499 ||  || — || October 6, 2002 || Socorro || LINEAR || EUN || align=right | 1.8 km || 
|-id=500 bgcolor=#E9E9E9
| 399500 ||  || — || October 10, 2002 || Socorro || LINEAR || EUN || align=right | 1.7 km || 
|}

399501–399600 

|-bgcolor=#E9E9E9
| 399501 ||  || — || October 4, 2002 || Apache Point || SDSS || — || align=right | 1.7 km || 
|-id=502 bgcolor=#E9E9E9
| 399502 ||  || — || October 10, 2002 || Apache Point || SDSS || (5) || align=right data-sort-value="0.70" | 700 m || 
|-id=503 bgcolor=#fefefe
| 399503 ||  || — || October 15, 2002 || Palomar || NEAT || — || align=right data-sort-value="0.74" | 740 m || 
|-id=504 bgcolor=#FA8072
| 399504 ||  || — || October 27, 2002 || Socorro || LINEAR || H || align=right data-sort-value="0.88" | 880 m || 
|-id=505 bgcolor=#E9E9E9
| 399505 ||  || — || October 28, 2002 || Palomar || NEAT || — || align=right | 1.4 km || 
|-id=506 bgcolor=#E9E9E9
| 399506 ||  || — || October 28, 2002 || Palomar || NEAT || — || align=right | 1.7 km || 
|-id=507 bgcolor=#E9E9E9
| 399507 ||  || — || November 1, 2002 || Palomar || NEAT || (5) || align=right data-sort-value="0.85" | 850 m || 
|-id=508 bgcolor=#E9E9E9
| 399508 ||  || — || November 1, 2002 || Palomar || NEAT || MAR || align=right | 1.6 km || 
|-id=509 bgcolor=#E9E9E9
| 399509 ||  || — || November 1, 2002 || Palomar || NEAT || (5) || align=right data-sort-value="0.94" | 940 m || 
|-id=510 bgcolor=#E9E9E9
| 399510 ||  || — || November 1, 2002 || Palomar || NEAT || EUN || align=right | 1.5 km || 
|-id=511 bgcolor=#E9E9E9
| 399511 ||  || — || November 5, 2002 || Socorro || LINEAR || critical || align=right | 1.0 km || 
|-id=512 bgcolor=#E9E9E9
| 399512 ||  || — || November 5, 2002 || Palomar || NEAT || (5) || align=right data-sort-value="0.74" | 740 m || 
|-id=513 bgcolor=#E9E9E9
| 399513 ||  || — || November 6, 2002 || Anderson Mesa || LONEOS || EUN || align=right | 1.5 km || 
|-id=514 bgcolor=#E9E9E9
| 399514 ||  || — || November 7, 2002 || Socorro || LINEAR || MIS || align=right | 2.7 km || 
|-id=515 bgcolor=#E9E9E9
| 399515 ||  || — || November 8, 2002 || Socorro || LINEAR || — || align=right | 1.1 km || 
|-id=516 bgcolor=#fefefe
| 399516 ||  || — || November 12, 2002 || Socorro || LINEAR || H || align=right data-sort-value="0.91" | 910 m || 
|-id=517 bgcolor=#E9E9E9
| 399517 ||  || — || November 1, 2002 || Palomar || S. F. Hönig || (5) || align=right data-sort-value="0.89" | 890 m || 
|-id=518 bgcolor=#E9E9E9
| 399518 ||  || — || November 6, 2002 || Anderson Mesa || LONEOS || KON || align=right | 3.0 km || 
|-id=519 bgcolor=#E9E9E9
| 399519 ||  || — || November 24, 2002 || Palomar || NEAT || — || align=right | 2.8 km || 
|-id=520 bgcolor=#E9E9E9
| 399520 ||  || — || November 24, 2002 || Palomar || NEAT || — || align=right | 1.6 km || 
|-id=521 bgcolor=#E9E9E9
| 399521 ||  || — || November 30, 2002 || Socorro || LINEAR || — || align=right | 1.5 km || 
|-id=522 bgcolor=#E9E9E9
| 399522 ||  || — || December 6, 2002 || Socorro || LINEAR || — || align=right | 2.8 km || 
|-id=523 bgcolor=#E9E9E9
| 399523 ||  || — || December 11, 2002 || Socorro || LINEAR || EUN || align=right | 3.6 km || 
|-id=524 bgcolor=#E9E9E9
| 399524 ||  || — || December 5, 2002 || Socorro || LINEAR || — || align=right | 2.3 km || 
|-id=525 bgcolor=#E9E9E9
| 399525 ||  || — || December 31, 2002 || Socorro || LINEAR || — || align=right | 2.2 km || 
|-id=526 bgcolor=#FA8072
| 399526 ||  || — || December 7, 2002 || Socorro || LINEAR || — || align=right data-sort-value="0.83" | 830 m || 
|-id=527 bgcolor=#E9E9E9
| 399527 ||  || — || January 25, 2003 || Palomar || NEAT || — || align=right | 2.0 km || 
|-id=528 bgcolor=#fefefe
| 399528 ||  || — || February 4, 2003 || Socorro || LINEAR || — || align=right data-sort-value="0.94" | 940 m || 
|-id=529 bgcolor=#fefefe
| 399529 ||  || — || March 7, 2003 || Anderson Mesa || LONEOS || — || align=right data-sort-value="0.90" | 900 m || 
|-id=530 bgcolor=#fefefe
| 399530 ||  || — || April 7, 2003 || Kitt Peak || Spacewatch || — || align=right | 1.8 km || 
|-id=531 bgcolor=#fefefe
| 399531 ||  || — || April 29, 2003 || Socorro || LINEAR || — || align=right | 1.8 km || 
|-id=532 bgcolor=#fefefe
| 399532 ||  || — || April 25, 2003 || Kitt Peak || Spacewatch || MAS || align=right data-sort-value="0.75" | 750 m || 
|-id=533 bgcolor=#fefefe
| 399533 ||  || — || May 5, 2003 || Socorro || LINEAR || — || align=right data-sort-value="0.78" | 780 m || 
|-id=534 bgcolor=#fefefe
| 399534 ||  || — || May 29, 2003 || Socorro || LINEAR || H || align=right | 1.0 km || 
|-id=535 bgcolor=#d6d6d6
| 399535 ||  || — || May 22, 2003 || Kitt Peak || Spacewatch || — || align=right | 2.4 km || 
|-id=536 bgcolor=#fefefe
| 399536 ||  || — || June 25, 2003 || Nogales || M. Schwartz, P. R. Holvorcem || NYS || align=right data-sort-value="0.48" | 480 m || 
|-id=537 bgcolor=#d6d6d6
| 399537 ||  || — || July 4, 2003 || Socorro || LINEAR || Tj (2.95) || align=right | 5.5 km || 
|-id=538 bgcolor=#d6d6d6
| 399538 ||  || — || July 3, 2003 || Kitt Peak || Spacewatch || EUP || align=right | 3.3 km || 
|-id=539 bgcolor=#fefefe
| 399539 ||  || — || July 30, 2003 || Socorro || LINEAR || — || align=right | 1.1 km || 
|-id=540 bgcolor=#d6d6d6
| 399540 ||  || — || August 1, 2003 || Socorro || LINEAR || — || align=right | 4.0 km || 
|-id=541 bgcolor=#d6d6d6
| 399541 ||  || — || August 2, 2003 || Haleakala || NEAT || — || align=right | 3.5 km || 
|-id=542 bgcolor=#fefefe
| 399542 ||  || — || August 4, 2003 || Socorro || LINEAR || — || align=right data-sort-value="0.94" | 940 m || 
|-id=543 bgcolor=#d6d6d6
| 399543 ||  || — || August 19, 2003 || Campo Imperatore || CINEOS || — || align=right | 3.4 km || 
|-id=544 bgcolor=#d6d6d6
| 399544 ||  || — || August 20, 2003 || Socorro || LINEAR || Tj (2.99) || align=right | 5.4 km || 
|-id=545 bgcolor=#fefefe
| 399545 ||  || — || August 20, 2003 || Palomar || NEAT || — || align=right data-sort-value="0.95" | 950 m || 
|-id=546 bgcolor=#d6d6d6
| 399546 ||  || — || August 20, 2003 || Palomar || NEAT || — || align=right | 2.6 km || 
|-id=547 bgcolor=#d6d6d6
| 399547 ||  || — || August 22, 2003 || Campo Imperatore || CINEOS || — || align=right | 2.9 km || 
|-id=548 bgcolor=#d6d6d6
| 399548 ||  || — || August 20, 2003 || Palomar || NEAT || — || align=right | 4.3 km || 
|-id=549 bgcolor=#fefefe
| 399549 ||  || — || August 23, 2003 || Palomar || NEAT || NYS || align=right data-sort-value="0.70" | 700 m || 
|-id=550 bgcolor=#d6d6d6
| 399550 ||  || — || August 31, 2003 || Socorro || LINEAR || LIX || align=right | 4.7 km || 
|-id=551 bgcolor=#d6d6d6
| 399551 ||  || — || September 4, 2003 || Socorro || LINEAR || — || align=right | 3.3 km || 
|-id=552 bgcolor=#fefefe
| 399552 ||  || — || September 14, 2003 || Palomar || NEAT || — || align=right | 1.4 km || 
|-id=553 bgcolor=#d6d6d6
| 399553 ||  || — || September 1, 2003 || Socorro || LINEAR || THB || align=right | 3.6 km || 
|-id=554 bgcolor=#fefefe
| 399554 || 2003 SB || — || September 16, 2003 || Palomar || NEAT || — || align=right | 1.2 km || 
|-id=555 bgcolor=#d6d6d6
| 399555 ||  || — || September 18, 2003 || Palomar || NEAT || — || align=right | 4.2 km || 
|-id=556 bgcolor=#fefefe
| 399556 ||  || — || August 26, 2003 || Socorro || LINEAR || — || align=right | 1.1 km || 
|-id=557 bgcolor=#fefefe
| 399557 ||  || — || September 16, 2003 || Anderson Mesa || LONEOS || NYS || align=right data-sort-value="0.88" | 880 m || 
|-id=558 bgcolor=#fefefe
| 399558 ||  || — || September 18, 2003 || Campo Imperatore || CINEOS || — || align=right data-sort-value="0.91" | 910 m || 
|-id=559 bgcolor=#d6d6d6
| 399559 ||  || — || September 18, 2003 || Kitt Peak || Spacewatch || — || align=right | 4.3 km || 
|-id=560 bgcolor=#fefefe
| 399560 ||  || — || September 18, 2003 || Campo Imperatore || CINEOS || — || align=right data-sort-value="0.78" | 780 m || 
|-id=561 bgcolor=#d6d6d6
| 399561 ||  || — || September 19, 2003 || Palomar || NEAT || — || align=right | 4.4 km || 
|-id=562 bgcolor=#d6d6d6
| 399562 ||  || — || September 20, 2003 || Kitt Peak || Spacewatch || — || align=right | 5.4 km || 
|-id=563 bgcolor=#fefefe
| 399563 ||  || — || September 20, 2003 || Socorro || LINEAR || — || align=right data-sort-value="0.90" | 900 m || 
|-id=564 bgcolor=#d6d6d6
| 399564 ||  || — || September 16, 2003 || Palomar || NEAT || — || align=right | 3.8 km || 
|-id=565 bgcolor=#fefefe
| 399565 Dévényanna ||  ||  || September 20, 2003 || Piszkéstető || K. Sárneczky, B. Sipőcz || — || align=right data-sort-value="0.96" | 960 m || 
|-id=566 bgcolor=#d6d6d6
| 399566 ||  || — || September 19, 2003 || Haleakala || NEAT || THB || align=right | 4.3 km || 
|-id=567 bgcolor=#E9E9E9
| 399567 ||  || — || September 22, 2003 || Palomar || NEAT || — || align=right | 1.1 km || 
|-id=568 bgcolor=#fefefe
| 399568 ||  || — || September 18, 2003 || Socorro || LINEAR || MAS || align=right data-sort-value="0.74" | 740 m || 
|-id=569 bgcolor=#d6d6d6
| 399569 ||  || — || September 19, 2003 || Kitt Peak || Spacewatch || critical || align=right | 2.0 km || 
|-id=570 bgcolor=#fefefe
| 399570 ||  || — || September 20, 2003 || Palomar || NEAT || — || align=right data-sort-value="0.82" | 820 m || 
|-id=571 bgcolor=#fefefe
| 399571 ||  || — || September 23, 2003 || Palomar || NEAT || — || align=right data-sort-value="0.91" | 910 m || 
|-id=572 bgcolor=#d6d6d6
| 399572 ||  || — || September 23, 2003 || Palomar || NEAT || — || align=right | 3.1 km || 
|-id=573 bgcolor=#fefefe
| 399573 ||  || — || September 29, 2003 || Prescott || P. G. Comba || — || align=right | 1.0 km || 
|-id=574 bgcolor=#fefefe
| 399574 ||  || — || September 26, 2003 || Socorro || LINEAR || — || align=right data-sort-value="0.98" | 980 m || 
|-id=575 bgcolor=#FA8072
| 399575 ||  || — || September 28, 2003 || Kitt Peak || Spacewatch || — || align=right data-sort-value="0.83" | 830 m || 
|-id=576 bgcolor=#fefefe
| 399576 ||  || — || September 27, 2003 || Socorro || LINEAR || — || align=right data-sort-value="0.91" | 910 m || 
|-id=577 bgcolor=#d6d6d6
| 399577 ||  || — || September 28, 2003 || Kitt Peak || Spacewatch || THB || align=right | 3.6 km || 
|-id=578 bgcolor=#d6d6d6
| 399578 ||  || — || September 30, 2003 || Socorro || LINEAR || — || align=right | 2.6 km || 
|-id=579 bgcolor=#d6d6d6
| 399579 ||  || — || September 18, 2003 || Haleakala || NEAT || — || align=right | 3.4 km || 
|-id=580 bgcolor=#d6d6d6
| 399580 ||  || — || September 28, 2003 || Anderson Mesa || LONEOS || — || align=right | 3.7 km || 
|-id=581 bgcolor=#fefefe
| 399581 ||  || — || September 18, 2003 || Socorro || LINEAR || NYS || align=right data-sort-value="0.64" | 640 m || 
|-id=582 bgcolor=#d6d6d6
| 399582 ||  || — || September 16, 2003 || Kitt Peak || Spacewatch || — || align=right | 4.1 km || 
|-id=583 bgcolor=#fefefe
| 399583 ||  || — || September 18, 2003 || Kitt Peak || Spacewatch || — || align=right data-sort-value="0.78" | 780 m || 
|-id=584 bgcolor=#fefefe
| 399584 ||  || — || September 26, 2003 || Apache Point || SDSS || — || align=right data-sort-value="0.96" | 960 m || 
|-id=585 bgcolor=#fefefe
| 399585 ||  || — || September 28, 2003 || Anderson Mesa || LONEOS || — || align=right data-sort-value="0.84" | 840 m || 
|-id=586 bgcolor=#fefefe
| 399586 ||  || — || October 1, 2003 || Anderson Mesa || LONEOS || — || align=right | 1.1 km || 
|-id=587 bgcolor=#FA8072
| 399587 ||  || — || October 15, 2003 || Socorro || LINEAR || — || align=right | 1.3 km || 
|-id=588 bgcolor=#fefefe
| 399588 ||  || — || September 21, 2003 || Anderson Mesa || LONEOS || — || align=right | 1.0 km || 
|-id=589 bgcolor=#d6d6d6
| 399589 ||  || — || October 3, 2003 || Kitt Peak || Spacewatch || — || align=right | 3.9 km || 
|-id=590 bgcolor=#d6d6d6
| 399590 ||  || — || October 18, 2003 || Palomar || NEAT || — || align=right | 3.8 km || 
|-id=591 bgcolor=#fefefe
| 399591 ||  || — || October 16, 2003 || Palomar || NEAT || — || align=right data-sort-value="0.94" | 940 m || 
|-id=592 bgcolor=#d6d6d6
| 399592 ||  || — || October 19, 2003 || Anderson Mesa || LONEOS || — || align=right | 5.2 km || 
|-id=593 bgcolor=#fefefe
| 399593 ||  || — || October 19, 2003 || Kitt Peak || Spacewatch || MAS || align=right data-sort-value="0.82" | 820 m || 
|-id=594 bgcolor=#fefefe
| 399594 ||  || — || October 15, 2003 || Anderson Mesa || LONEOS || — || align=right data-sort-value="0.98" | 980 m || 
|-id=595 bgcolor=#fefefe
| 399595 ||  || — || October 19, 2003 || Kitt Peak || Spacewatch || NYS || align=right data-sort-value="0.69" | 690 m || 
|-id=596 bgcolor=#E9E9E9
| 399596 ||  || — || September 30, 2003 || Kitt Peak || Spacewatch || — || align=right | 1.2 km || 
|-id=597 bgcolor=#d6d6d6
| 399597 ||  || — || September 17, 2003 || Kitt Peak || Spacewatch || — || align=right | 3.8 km || 
|-id=598 bgcolor=#d6d6d6
| 399598 ||  || — || October 19, 2003 || Apache Point || SDSS || — || align=right | 2.6 km || 
|-id=599 bgcolor=#fefefe
| 399599 ||  || — || October 22, 2003 || Apache Point || SDSS || — || align=right data-sort-value="0.80" | 800 m || 
|-id=600 bgcolor=#d6d6d6
| 399600 ||  || — || October 22, 2003 || Kitt Peak || Spacewatch || — || align=right | 3.7 km || 
|}

399601–399700 

|-bgcolor=#fefefe
| 399601 ||  || — || November 19, 2003 || Catalina || CSS || — || align=right | 1.4 km || 
|-id=602 bgcolor=#E9E9E9
| 399602 ||  || — || November 18, 2003 || Kitt Peak || Spacewatch || — || align=right | 1.2 km || 
|-id=603 bgcolor=#E9E9E9
| 399603 ||  || — || October 26, 2003 || Kitt Peak || Spacewatch || HNS || align=right | 1.4 km || 
|-id=604 bgcolor=#fefefe
| 399604 ||  || — || November 19, 2003 || Kitt Peak || Spacewatch || — || align=right data-sort-value="0.99" | 990 m || 
|-id=605 bgcolor=#d6d6d6
| 399605 ||  || — || November 21, 2003 || Socorro || LINEAR || 7:4 || align=right | 3.9 km || 
|-id=606 bgcolor=#E9E9E9
| 399606 ||  || — || November 20, 2003 || Palomar || NEAT || — || align=right | 3.3 km || 
|-id=607 bgcolor=#fefefe
| 399607 ||  || — || October 21, 2003 || Anderson Mesa || LONEOS || — || align=right | 1.2 km || 
|-id=608 bgcolor=#E9E9E9
| 399608 ||  || — || December 18, 2003 || Socorro || LINEAR || — || align=right | 1.4 km || 
|-id=609 bgcolor=#E9E9E9
| 399609 ||  || — || December 17, 2003 || Socorro || LINEAR || — || align=right | 1.4 km || 
|-id=610 bgcolor=#E9E9E9
| 399610 ||  || — || December 29, 2003 || Catalina || CSS || — || align=right | 1.7 km || 
|-id=611 bgcolor=#FFC2E0
| 399611 ||  || — || January 18, 2004 || Catalina || CSS || AMO || align=right data-sort-value="0.50" | 500 m || 
|-id=612 bgcolor=#E9E9E9
| 399612 ||  || — || January 21, 2004 || Socorro || LINEAR || MAR || align=right | 1.1 km || 
|-id=613 bgcolor=#FA8072
| 399613 ||  || — || January 22, 2004 || Socorro || LINEAR || — || align=right | 1.2 km || 
|-id=614 bgcolor=#E9E9E9
| 399614 ||  || — || February 11, 2004 || Anderson Mesa || LONEOS || EUN || align=right | 1.4 km || 
|-id=615 bgcolor=#E9E9E9
| 399615 ||  || — || February 12, 2004 || Palomar || NEAT || — || align=right | 2.1 km || 
|-id=616 bgcolor=#E9E9E9
| 399616 ||  || — || February 17, 2004 || Socorro || LINEAR || — || align=right | 1.2 km || 
|-id=617 bgcolor=#E9E9E9
| 399617 ||  || — || February 16, 2004 || Kitt Peak || Spacewatch || — || align=right | 2.0 km || 
|-id=618 bgcolor=#E9E9E9
| 399618 ||  || — || February 18, 2004 || Socorro || LINEAR || — || align=right | 1.5 km || 
|-id=619 bgcolor=#E9E9E9
| 399619 ||  || — || March 15, 2004 || Socorro || LINEAR || — || align=right | 1.9 km || 
|-id=620 bgcolor=#E9E9E9
| 399620 ||  || — || March 23, 2004 || Socorro || LINEAR || — || align=right | 2.8 km || 
|-id=621 bgcolor=#FA8072
| 399621 ||  || — || April 14, 2004 || Kitt Peak || Spacewatch || — || align=right data-sort-value="0.66" | 660 m || 
|-id=622 bgcolor=#E9E9E9
| 399622 ||  || — || March 27, 2004 || Socorro || LINEAR || DOR || align=right | 2.3 km || 
|-id=623 bgcolor=#E9E9E9
| 399623 ||  || — || April 14, 2004 || Kitt Peak || Spacewatch || — || align=right | 2.3 km || 
|-id=624 bgcolor=#fefefe
| 399624 ||  || — || April 22, 2004 || Kitt Peak || Spacewatch || — || align=right data-sort-value="0.65" | 650 m || 
|-id=625 bgcolor=#fefefe
| 399625 ||  || — || June 22, 2004 || Campo Imperatore || CINEOS || H || align=right data-sort-value="0.81" | 810 m || 
|-id=626 bgcolor=#d6d6d6
| 399626 ||  || — || July 11, 2004 || Socorro || LINEAR || — || align=right | 3.6 km || 
|-id=627 bgcolor=#d6d6d6
| 399627 ||  || — || July 14, 2004 || Socorro || LINEAR || — || align=right | 2.6 km || 
|-id=628 bgcolor=#FA8072
| 399628 ||  || — || July 14, 2004 || Socorro || LINEAR || — || align=right data-sort-value="0.72" | 720 m || 
|-id=629 bgcolor=#d6d6d6
| 399629 ||  || — || July 11, 2004 || Socorro || LINEAR || — || align=right | 2.1 km || 
|-id=630 bgcolor=#FA8072
| 399630 ||  || — || July 16, 2004 || Socorro || LINEAR || — || align=right data-sort-value="0.93" | 930 m || 
|-id=631 bgcolor=#d6d6d6
| 399631 ||  || — || July 20, 2004 || Siding Spring || SSS || — || align=right | 4.2 km || 
|-id=632 bgcolor=#FA8072
| 399632 ||  || — || August 8, 2004 || Socorro || LINEAR || critical || align=right data-sort-value="0.59" | 590 m || 
|-id=633 bgcolor=#d6d6d6
| 399633 ||  || — || August 8, 2004 || Socorro || LINEAR || — || align=right | 2.4 km || 
|-id=634 bgcolor=#fefefe
| 399634 ||  || — || August 8, 2004 || Socorro || LINEAR || — || align=right data-sort-value="0.97" | 970 m || 
|-id=635 bgcolor=#fefefe
| 399635 ||  || — || August 8, 2004 || Campo Imperatore || CINEOS || — || align=right data-sort-value="0.84" | 840 m || 
|-id=636 bgcolor=#d6d6d6
| 399636 ||  || — || August 8, 2004 || Palomar || NEAT || — || align=right | 3.0 km || 
|-id=637 bgcolor=#FA8072
| 399637 ||  || — || August 7, 2004 || Campo Imperatore || CINEOS || — || align=right data-sort-value="0.80" | 800 m || 
|-id=638 bgcolor=#fefefe
| 399638 ||  || — || August 12, 2004 || Campo Imperatore || CINEOS || H || align=right data-sort-value="0.84" | 840 m || 
|-id=639 bgcolor=#d6d6d6
| 399639 ||  || — || July 13, 2004 || Siding Spring || SSS || — || align=right | 2.7 km || 
|-id=640 bgcolor=#FA8072
| 399640 ||  || — || August 21, 2004 || Siding Spring || SSS || — || align=right data-sort-value="0.70" | 700 m || 
|-id=641 bgcolor=#fefefe
| 399641 ||  || — || August 8, 2004 || Socorro || LINEAR || — || align=right data-sort-value="0.77" | 770 m || 
|-id=642 bgcolor=#d6d6d6
| 399642 ||  || — || August 23, 2004 || Siding Spring || SSS || — || align=right | 3.9 km || 
|-id=643 bgcolor=#d6d6d6
| 399643 ||  || — || September 6, 2004 || Socorro || LINEAR || — || align=right | 3.6 km || 
|-id=644 bgcolor=#fefefe
| 399644 ||  || — || August 21, 2004 || Catalina || CSS || — || align=right data-sort-value="0.87" | 870 m || 
|-id=645 bgcolor=#d6d6d6
| 399645 ||  || — || September 7, 2004 || Kitt Peak || Spacewatch || — || align=right | 2.9 km || 
|-id=646 bgcolor=#fefefe
| 399646 ||  || — || September 8, 2004 || Socorro || LINEAR || — || align=right data-sort-value="0.78" | 780 m || 
|-id=647 bgcolor=#fefefe
| 399647 ||  || — || August 15, 2004 || Campo Imperatore || CINEOS || — || align=right data-sort-value="0.70" | 700 m || 
|-id=648 bgcolor=#fefefe
| 399648 ||  || — || August 8, 2004 || Socorro || LINEAR || NYS || align=right data-sort-value="0.70" | 700 m || 
|-id=649 bgcolor=#fefefe
| 399649 ||  || — || September 8, 2004 || Socorro || LINEAR || — || align=right data-sort-value="0.87" | 870 m || 
|-id=650 bgcolor=#d6d6d6
| 399650 ||  || — || September 7, 2004 || Kitt Peak || Spacewatch || — || align=right | 2.3 km || 
|-id=651 bgcolor=#d6d6d6
| 399651 ||  || — || September 10, 2004 || Socorro || LINEAR || TIR || align=right | 3.2 km || 
|-id=652 bgcolor=#d6d6d6
| 399652 ||  || — || September 10, 2004 || Socorro || LINEAR || — || align=right | 3.0 km || 
|-id=653 bgcolor=#d6d6d6
| 399653 ||  || — || September 7, 2004 || Socorro || LINEAR || — || align=right | 2.6 km || 
|-id=654 bgcolor=#fefefe
| 399654 ||  || — || September 9, 2004 || Kitt Peak || Spacewatch || — || align=right data-sort-value="0.87" | 870 m || 
|-id=655 bgcolor=#FA8072
| 399655 ||  || — || September 10, 2004 || Socorro || LINEAR || — || align=right data-sort-value="0.60" | 600 m || 
|-id=656 bgcolor=#d6d6d6
| 399656 ||  || — || September 10, 2004 || Socorro || LINEAR || LIX || align=right | 3.7 km || 
|-id=657 bgcolor=#fefefe
| 399657 ||  || — || August 26, 2004 || Catalina || CSS || — || align=right data-sort-value="0.88" | 880 m || 
|-id=658 bgcolor=#fefefe
| 399658 ||  || — || September 10, 2004 || Socorro || LINEAR || (2076) || align=right data-sort-value="0.85" | 850 m || 
|-id=659 bgcolor=#d6d6d6
| 399659 ||  || — || September 10, 2004 || Socorro || LINEAR || — || align=right | 3.5 km || 
|-id=660 bgcolor=#fefefe
| 399660 ||  || — || September 10, 2004 || Socorro || LINEAR || V || align=right data-sort-value="0.70" | 700 m || 
|-id=661 bgcolor=#d6d6d6
| 399661 ||  || — || September 10, 2004 || Socorro || LINEAR || — || align=right | 2.5 km || 
|-id=662 bgcolor=#d6d6d6
| 399662 ||  || — || September 7, 2004 || Palomar || NEAT || — || align=right | 2.7 km || 
|-id=663 bgcolor=#d6d6d6
| 399663 ||  || — || September 11, 2004 || Socorro || LINEAR || — || align=right | 4.1 km || 
|-id=664 bgcolor=#fefefe
| 399664 ||  || — || September 10, 2004 || Socorro || LINEAR || — || align=right data-sort-value="0.82" | 820 m || 
|-id=665 bgcolor=#d6d6d6
| 399665 ||  || — || September 10, 2004 || Kitt Peak || Spacewatch || THM || align=right | 2.1 km || 
|-id=666 bgcolor=#fefefe
| 399666 ||  || — || September 14, 2004 || Socorro || LINEAR || H || align=right data-sort-value="0.67" | 670 m || 
|-id=667 bgcolor=#fefefe
| 399667 ||  || — || September 11, 2004 || Kitt Peak || Spacewatch || — || align=right data-sort-value="0.66" | 660 m || 
|-id=668 bgcolor=#d6d6d6
| 399668 ||  || — || September 15, 2004 || Kitt Peak || Spacewatch || EOS || align=right | 2.1 km || 
|-id=669 bgcolor=#d6d6d6
| 399669 ||  || — || September 15, 2004 || Kitt Peak || Spacewatch || — || align=right | 2.9 km || 
|-id=670 bgcolor=#d6d6d6
| 399670 ||  || — || September 14, 2004 || Palomar || NEAT || — || align=right | 3.8 km || 
|-id=671 bgcolor=#fefefe
| 399671 ||  || — || September 17, 2004 || Socorro || LINEAR || — || align=right data-sort-value="0.87" | 870 m || 
|-id=672 bgcolor=#fefefe
| 399672 ||  || — || September 14, 2004 || Anderson Mesa || LONEOS || — || align=right data-sort-value="0.70" | 700 m || 
|-id=673 bgcolor=#d6d6d6
| 399673 Kadenyuk ||  ||  || September 19, 2004 || Andrushivka || Andrushivka Obs. || EOS || align=right | 2.6 km || 
|-id=674 bgcolor=#d6d6d6
| 399674 ||  || — || September 7, 2004 || Kitt Peak || Spacewatch || EOS || align=right | 2.3 km || 
|-id=675 bgcolor=#fefefe
| 399675 ||  || — || August 15, 2004 || Siding Spring || SSS || — || align=right data-sort-value="0.85" | 850 m || 
|-id=676 bgcolor=#fefefe
| 399676 ||  || — || September 18, 2004 || Socorro || LINEAR || — || align=right data-sort-value="0.77" | 770 m || 
|-id=677 bgcolor=#d6d6d6
| 399677 ||  || — || September 18, 2004 || Socorro || LINEAR || — || align=right | 2.5 km || 
|-id=678 bgcolor=#d6d6d6
| 399678 ||  || — || September 22, 2004 || Socorro || LINEAR || — || align=right | 3.3 km || 
|-id=679 bgcolor=#d6d6d6
| 399679 ||  || — || October 8, 2004 || Kitt Peak || Spacewatch || — || align=right | 3.2 km || 
|-id=680 bgcolor=#d6d6d6
| 399680 ||  || — || October 4, 2004 || Apache Point || Apache Point Obs. || — || align=right | 2.5 km || 
|-id=681 bgcolor=#fefefe
| 399681 ||  || — || October 4, 2004 || Kitt Peak || Spacewatch || — || align=right data-sort-value="0.62" | 620 m || 
|-id=682 bgcolor=#fefefe
| 399682 ||  || — || October 4, 2004 || Kitt Peak || Spacewatch || — || align=right data-sort-value="0.94" | 940 m || 
|-id=683 bgcolor=#fefefe
| 399683 ||  || — || October 4, 2004 || Kitt Peak || Spacewatch || — || align=right data-sort-value="0.82" | 820 m || 
|-id=684 bgcolor=#d6d6d6
| 399684 ||  || — || October 5, 2004 || Kitt Peak || Spacewatch || — || align=right | 2.3 km || 
|-id=685 bgcolor=#d6d6d6
| 399685 ||  || — || October 6, 2004 || Kitt Peak || Spacewatch || — || align=right | 3.4 km || 
|-id=686 bgcolor=#fefefe
| 399686 ||  || — || October 6, 2004 || Kitt Peak || Spacewatch || — || align=right data-sort-value="0.97" | 970 m || 
|-id=687 bgcolor=#d6d6d6
| 399687 ||  || — || October 6, 2004 || Kitt Peak || Spacewatch || — || align=right | 4.0 km || 
|-id=688 bgcolor=#fefefe
| 399688 ||  || — || October 7, 2004 || Socorro || LINEAR || — || align=right data-sort-value="0.72" | 720 m || 
|-id=689 bgcolor=#fefefe
| 399689 ||  || — || October 5, 2004 || Kitt Peak || Spacewatch || — || align=right data-sort-value="0.68" | 680 m || 
|-id=690 bgcolor=#d6d6d6
| 399690 ||  || — || October 5, 2004 || Kitt Peak || Spacewatch || — || align=right | 2.5 km || 
|-id=691 bgcolor=#d6d6d6
| 399691 ||  || — || September 17, 2004 || Kitt Peak || Spacewatch || — || align=right | 2.7 km || 
|-id=692 bgcolor=#d6d6d6
| 399692 ||  || — || October 6, 2004 || Kitt Peak || Spacewatch || THM || align=right | 2.6 km || 
|-id=693 bgcolor=#fefefe
| 399693 ||  || — || October 6, 2004 || Palomar || NEAT || — || align=right data-sort-value="0.75" | 750 m || 
|-id=694 bgcolor=#d6d6d6
| 399694 ||  || — || September 24, 2004 || Socorro || LINEAR || EOS || align=right | 2.2 km || 
|-id=695 bgcolor=#d6d6d6
| 399695 ||  || — || October 4, 2004 || Kitt Peak || Spacewatch || — || align=right | 3.4 km || 
|-id=696 bgcolor=#d6d6d6
| 399696 ||  || — || October 6, 2004 || Kitt Peak || Spacewatch || — || align=right | 2.8 km || 
|-id=697 bgcolor=#d6d6d6
| 399697 ||  || — || October 6, 2004 || Kitt Peak || Spacewatch || — || align=right | 2.4 km || 
|-id=698 bgcolor=#d6d6d6
| 399698 ||  || — || October 6, 2004 || Kitt Peak || Spacewatch || — || align=right | 3.0 km || 
|-id=699 bgcolor=#d6d6d6
| 399699 ||  || — || September 10, 2004 || Kitt Peak || Spacewatch || — || align=right | 3.0 km || 
|-id=700 bgcolor=#fefefe
| 399700 ||  || — || October 7, 2004 || Kitt Peak || Spacewatch || — || align=right data-sort-value="0.92" | 920 m || 
|}

399701–399800 

|-bgcolor=#d6d6d6
| 399701 ||  || — || October 8, 2004 || Kitt Peak || Spacewatch || — || align=right | 3.3 km || 
|-id=702 bgcolor=#fefefe
| 399702 ||  || — || October 9, 2004 || Kitt Peak || Spacewatch || — || align=right data-sort-value="0.57" | 570 m || 
|-id=703 bgcolor=#d6d6d6
| 399703 ||  || — || October 9, 2004 || Kitt Peak || Spacewatch || — || align=right | 2.7 km || 
|-id=704 bgcolor=#fefefe
| 399704 ||  || — || September 7, 2004 || Kitt Peak || Spacewatch || — || align=right data-sort-value="0.73" | 730 m || 
|-id=705 bgcolor=#d6d6d6
| 399705 ||  || — || October 8, 2004 || Socorro || LINEAR || EOS || align=right | 2.7 km || 
|-id=706 bgcolor=#d6d6d6
| 399706 ||  || — || October 9, 2004 || Anderson Mesa || LONEOS || — || align=right | 3.8 km || 
|-id=707 bgcolor=#d6d6d6
| 399707 ||  || — || October 12, 2004 || Kitt Peak || Spacewatch || — || align=right | 2.5 km || 
|-id=708 bgcolor=#fefefe
| 399708 ||  || — || October 11, 2004 || Kitt Peak || Spacewatch || — || align=right data-sort-value="0.54" | 540 m || 
|-id=709 bgcolor=#fefefe
| 399709 ||  || — || October 8, 2004 || Kitt Peak || Spacewatch || NYS || align=right data-sort-value="0.79" | 790 m || 
|-id=710 bgcolor=#fefefe
| 399710 ||  || — || October 7, 2004 || Anderson Mesa || LONEOS || — || align=right data-sort-value="0.76" | 760 m || 
|-id=711 bgcolor=#d6d6d6
| 399711 ||  || — || October 21, 2004 || Socorro || LINEAR || — || align=right | 4.4 km || 
|-id=712 bgcolor=#d6d6d6
| 399712 ||  || — || November 3, 2004 || Anderson Mesa || LONEOS || — || align=right | 4.1 km || 
|-id=713 bgcolor=#fefefe
| 399713 ||  || — || October 13, 2004 || Kitt Peak || Spacewatch || — || align=right data-sort-value="0.97" | 970 m || 
|-id=714 bgcolor=#FA8072
| 399714 ||  || — || November 5, 2004 || Kitt Peak || Spacewatch || — || align=right | 1.0 km || 
|-id=715 bgcolor=#fefefe
| 399715 ||  || — || October 10, 2004 || Kitt Peak || Spacewatch || — || align=right data-sort-value="0.74" | 740 m || 
|-id=716 bgcolor=#fefefe
| 399716 ||  || — || November 4, 2004 || Kitt Peak || Spacewatch || — || align=right data-sort-value="0.76" | 760 m || 
|-id=717 bgcolor=#d6d6d6
| 399717 ||  || — || October 7, 2004 || Kitt Peak || Spacewatch || — || align=right | 3.4 km || 
|-id=718 bgcolor=#fefefe
| 399718 ||  || — || November 13, 2004 || Great Shefford || P. Birtwhistle || V || align=right data-sort-value="0.85" | 850 m || 
|-id=719 bgcolor=#fefefe
| 399719 ||  || — || November 3, 2004 || Catalina || CSS || H || align=right data-sort-value="0.78" | 780 m || 
|-id=720 bgcolor=#d6d6d6
| 399720 ||  || — || November 18, 2004 || Campo Imperatore || CINEOS || — || align=right | 2.5 km || 
|-id=721 bgcolor=#fefefe
| 399721 ||  || — || November 19, 2004 || Catalina || CSS || — || align=right data-sort-value="0.90" | 900 m || 
|-id=722 bgcolor=#d6d6d6
| 399722 ||  || — || November 19, 2004 || Catalina || CSS || — || align=right | 2.8 km || 
|-id=723 bgcolor=#fefefe
| 399723 ||  || — || December 2, 2004 || Palomar || NEAT || — || align=right | 1.1 km || 
|-id=724 bgcolor=#d6d6d6
| 399724 ||  || — || December 10, 2004 || Kitt Peak || Spacewatch || — || align=right | 2.8 km || 
|-id=725 bgcolor=#d6d6d6
| 399725 ||  || — || December 2, 2004 || Socorro || LINEAR || — || align=right | 3.2 km || 
|-id=726 bgcolor=#d6d6d6
| 399726 ||  || — || November 11, 2004 || Kitt Peak || Spacewatch || — || align=right | 3.2 km || 
|-id=727 bgcolor=#d6d6d6
| 399727 ||  || — || December 12, 2004 || Kitt Peak || Spacewatch || Tj (2.98) || align=right | 4.3 km || 
|-id=728 bgcolor=#d6d6d6
| 399728 ||  || — || December 11, 2004 || Kitt Peak || Spacewatch || — || align=right | 2.3 km || 
|-id=729 bgcolor=#d6d6d6
| 399729 ||  || — || December 18, 2004 || Mount Lemmon || Mount Lemmon Survey || EUP || align=right | 4.9 km || 
|-id=730 bgcolor=#fefefe
| 399730 ||  || — || January 6, 2005 || Catalina || CSS || H || align=right data-sort-value="0.67" | 670 m || 
|-id=731 bgcolor=#fefefe
| 399731 ||  || — || January 6, 2005 || Socorro || LINEAR || H || align=right data-sort-value="0.89" | 890 m || 
|-id=732 bgcolor=#fefefe
| 399732 ||  || — || January 13, 2005 || Socorro || LINEAR || — || align=right | 1.1 km || 
|-id=733 bgcolor=#fefefe
| 399733 ||  || — || January 16, 2005 || Kitt Peak || Spacewatch || — || align=right | 1.0 km || 
|-id=734 bgcolor=#E9E9E9
| 399734 ||  || — || January 31, 2005 || Mayhill || A. Lowe || — || align=right data-sort-value="0.99" | 990 m || 
|-id=735 bgcolor=#FA8072
| 399735 ||  || — || February 28, 2005 || Socorro || LINEAR || — || align=right | 1.5 km || 
|-id=736 bgcolor=#E9E9E9
| 399736 ||  || — || February 28, 2005 || Goodricke-Pigott || R. A. Tucker || EUN || align=right | 1.7 km || 
|-id=737 bgcolor=#E9E9E9
| 399737 ||  || — || March 3, 2005 || Catalina || CSS || — || align=right | 1.5 km || 
|-id=738 bgcolor=#E9E9E9
| 399738 ||  || — || March 4, 2005 || Kitt Peak || Spacewatch || — || align=right data-sort-value="0.90" | 900 m || 
|-id=739 bgcolor=#E9E9E9
| 399739 ||  || — || March 10, 2005 || Mount Lemmon || Mount Lemmon Survey || EUN || align=right | 1.6 km || 
|-id=740 bgcolor=#E9E9E9
| 399740 ||  || — || February 9, 2005 || Kitt Peak || Spacewatch || EUN || align=right | 1.3 km || 
|-id=741 bgcolor=#E9E9E9
| 399741 ||  || — || March 9, 2005 || Mount Lemmon || Mount Lemmon Survey || — || align=right | 1.3 km || 
|-id=742 bgcolor=#E9E9E9
| 399742 ||  || — || March 9, 2005 || Socorro || LINEAR || — || align=right | 1.7 km || 
|-id=743 bgcolor=#E9E9E9
| 399743 ||  || — || March 2, 2005 || Catalina || CSS || — || align=right | 1.1 km || 
|-id=744 bgcolor=#E9E9E9
| 399744 ||  || — || March 8, 2005 || Mount Lemmon || Mount Lemmon Survey || — || align=right | 1.4 km || 
|-id=745 bgcolor=#E9E9E9
| 399745 Ouchaou ||  ||  || April 3, 2005 || Vicques || M. Ory || — || align=right | 2.3 km || 
|-id=746 bgcolor=#E9E9E9
| 399746 ||  || — || March 10, 2005 || Mount Lemmon || Mount Lemmon Survey || — || align=right | 2.8 km || 
|-id=747 bgcolor=#E9E9E9
| 399747 ||  || — || April 5, 2005 || Mount Lemmon || Mount Lemmon Survey || — || align=right | 1.5 km || 
|-id=748 bgcolor=#E9E9E9
| 399748 ||  || — || April 5, 2005 || Anderson Mesa || LONEOS || — || align=right | 2.1 km || 
|-id=749 bgcolor=#E9E9E9
| 399749 ||  || — || April 10, 2005 || Kitt Peak || Spacewatch || — || align=right | 1.3 km || 
|-id=750 bgcolor=#E9E9E9
| 399750 ||  || — || April 10, 2005 || Kitt Peak || Spacewatch || critical || align=right data-sort-value="0.82" | 820 m || 
|-id=751 bgcolor=#E9E9E9
| 399751 ||  || — || April 11, 2005 || Kitt Peak || Spacewatch || — || align=right | 1.3 km || 
|-id=752 bgcolor=#fefefe
| 399752 ||  || — || April 10, 2005 || Kitt Peak || M. W. Buie || — || align=right data-sort-value="0.68" | 680 m || 
|-id=753 bgcolor=#E9E9E9
| 399753 ||  || — || April 5, 2005 || Anderson Mesa || LONEOS || — || align=right | 1.5 km || 
|-id=754 bgcolor=#E9E9E9
| 399754 ||  || — || April 17, 2005 || Kitt Peak || Spacewatch || — || align=right | 1.6 km || 
|-id=755 bgcolor=#E9E9E9
| 399755 ||  || — || May 4, 2005 || Mauna Kea || C. Veillet || — || align=right | 1.3 km || 
|-id=756 bgcolor=#E9E9E9
| 399756 ||  || — || May 4, 2005 || Siding Spring || SSS || JUN || align=right | 1.3 km || 
|-id=757 bgcolor=#E9E9E9
| 399757 ||  || — || May 4, 2005 || Kitt Peak || Spacewatch || EUN || align=right | 1.1 km || 
|-id=758 bgcolor=#E9E9E9
| 399758 ||  || — || May 9, 2005 || Siding Spring || SSS || — || align=right | 2.1 km || 
|-id=759 bgcolor=#E9E9E9
| 399759 ||  || — || May 9, 2005 || Kitt Peak || Spacewatch || — || align=right | 1.1 km || 
|-id=760 bgcolor=#E9E9E9
| 399760 ||  || — || May 11, 2005 || Catalina || CSS || — || align=right | 1.6 km || 
|-id=761 bgcolor=#E9E9E9
| 399761 ||  || — || May 10, 2005 || Kitt Peak || Spacewatch || — || align=right | 1.6 km || 
|-id=762 bgcolor=#E9E9E9
| 399762 ||  || — || May 15, 2005 || Palomar || NEAT || — || align=right | 1.7 km || 
|-id=763 bgcolor=#E9E9E9
| 399763 ||  || — || May 4, 2005 || Palomar || NEAT || — || align=right | 1.6 km || 
|-id=764 bgcolor=#E9E9E9
| 399764 ||  || — || May 12, 2005 || Campo Imperatore || CINEOS || critical || align=right | 1.2 km || 
|-id=765 bgcolor=#E9E9E9
| 399765 ||  || — || May 1, 2005 || Kitt Peak || Spacewatch || EUN || align=right | 1.3 km || 
|-id=766 bgcolor=#E9E9E9
| 399766 ||  || — || June 6, 2005 || Kitt Peak || Spacewatch || EUN || align=right | 1.1 km || 
|-id=767 bgcolor=#E9E9E9
| 399767 ||  || — || June 17, 2005 || Mount Lemmon || Mount Lemmon Survey || JUN || align=right | 1.6 km || 
|-id=768 bgcolor=#E9E9E9
| 399768 ||  || — || June 24, 2005 || Palomar || NEAT || JUN || align=right | 1.2 km || 
|-id=769 bgcolor=#E9E9E9
| 399769 ||  || — || June 28, 2005 || Kitt Peak || Spacewatch || — || align=right | 3.1 km || 
|-id=770 bgcolor=#d6d6d6
| 399770 ||  || — || June 29, 2005 || Kitt Peak || Spacewatch || — || align=right | 3.0 km || 
|-id=771 bgcolor=#E9E9E9
| 399771 ||  || — || June 30, 2005 || Kitt Peak || Spacewatch || AGN || align=right | 1.4 km || 
|-id=772 bgcolor=#E9E9E9
| 399772 ||  || — || June 27, 2005 || Palomar || NEAT || — || align=right | 2.1 km || 
|-id=773 bgcolor=#E9E9E9
| 399773 ||  || — || July 3, 2005 || Mount Lemmon || Mount Lemmon Survey || — || align=right | 1.8 km || 
|-id=774 bgcolor=#FFC2E0
| 399774 ||  || — || July 5, 2005 || Catalina || CSS || APOPHAmoon || align=right data-sort-value="0.69" | 690 m || 
|-id=775 bgcolor=#E9E9E9
| 399775 ||  || — || July 1, 2005 || Kitt Peak || Spacewatch || — || align=right | 2.2 km || 
|-id=776 bgcolor=#E9E9E9
| 399776 ||  || — || July 5, 2005 || Mount Lemmon || Mount Lemmon Survey || — || align=right | 2.4 km || 
|-id=777 bgcolor=#E9E9E9
| 399777 ||  || — || July 5, 2005 || Palomar || NEAT || — || align=right | 2.7 km || 
|-id=778 bgcolor=#E9E9E9
| 399778 ||  || — || July 5, 2005 || Kitt Peak || Spacewatch || — || align=right | 3.3 km || 
|-id=779 bgcolor=#E9E9E9
| 399779 ||  || — || July 5, 2005 || Kitt Peak || Spacewatch || — || align=right | 2.1 km || 
|-id=780 bgcolor=#E9E9E9
| 399780 ||  || — || July 5, 2005 || Kitt Peak || Spacewatch || — || align=right | 2.8 km || 
|-id=781 bgcolor=#E9E9E9
| 399781 ||  || — || July 7, 2005 || Kitt Peak || Spacewatch || JUN || align=right | 1.1 km || 
|-id=782 bgcolor=#E9E9E9
| 399782 ||  || — || July 10, 2005 || Kitt Peak || Spacewatch || — || align=right | 2.0 km || 
|-id=783 bgcolor=#E9E9E9
| 399783 ||  || — || July 9, 2005 || Reedy Creek || J. Broughton || — || align=right | 3.0 km || 
|-id=784 bgcolor=#E9E9E9
| 399784 ||  || — || July 9, 2005 || Kitt Peak || Spacewatch || — || align=right | 2.3 km || 
|-id=785 bgcolor=#E9E9E9
| 399785 ||  || — || July 5, 2005 || Siding Spring || R. H. McNaught || — || align=right | 2.3 km || 
|-id=786 bgcolor=#E9E9E9
| 399786 ||  || — || July 29, 2005 || Palomar || NEAT || — || align=right | 2.0 km || 
|-id=787 bgcolor=#d6d6d6
| 399787 ||  || — || July 30, 2005 || Palomar || NEAT || — || align=right | 3.6 km || 
|-id=788 bgcolor=#d6d6d6
| 399788 ||  || — || July 30, 2005 || Palomar || NEAT || — || align=right | 2.5 km || 
|-id=789 bgcolor=#E9E9E9
| 399789 ||  || — || August 1, 2005 || Siding Spring || SSS || — || align=right | 2.2 km || 
|-id=790 bgcolor=#E9E9E9
| 399790 ||  || — || August 4, 2005 || Palomar || NEAT || — || align=right | 1.7 km || 
|-id=791 bgcolor=#E9E9E9
| 399791 ||  || — || August 26, 2005 || Anderson Mesa || LONEOS || — || align=right | 2.8 km || 
|-id=792 bgcolor=#E9E9E9
| 399792 ||  || — || August 26, 2005 || Palomar || NEAT || — || align=right | 3.2 km || 
|-id=793 bgcolor=#E9E9E9
| 399793 ||  || — || August 29, 2005 || Socorro || LINEAR || — || align=right | 2.8 km || 
|-id=794 bgcolor=#E9E9E9
| 399794 ||  || — || August 25, 2005 || Palomar || NEAT || — || align=right | 2.6 km || 
|-id=795 bgcolor=#E9E9E9
| 399795 ||  || — || August 26, 2005 || Anderson Mesa || LONEOS || — || align=right | 3.2 km || 
|-id=796 bgcolor=#E9E9E9
| 399796 ||  || — || August 27, 2005 || Palomar || NEAT || HOF || align=right | 2.3 km || 
|-id=797 bgcolor=#d6d6d6
| 399797 ||  || — || August 27, 2005 || Palomar || NEAT || KOR || align=right | 1.3 km || 
|-id=798 bgcolor=#d6d6d6
| 399798 ||  || — || August 28, 2005 || Kitt Peak || Spacewatch || EOS || align=right | 1.9 km || 
|-id=799 bgcolor=#d6d6d6
| 399799 ||  || — || August 31, 2005 || Palomar || NEAT || — || align=right | 3.0 km || 
|-id=800 bgcolor=#E9E9E9
| 399800 ||  || — || September 5, 2005 || Catalina || CSS || — || align=right | 2.3 km || 
|}

399801–399900 

|-bgcolor=#E9E9E9
| 399801 ||  || — || September 14, 2005 || Catalina || CSS || — || align=right | 2.9 km || 
|-id=802 bgcolor=#E9E9E9
| 399802 ||  || — || September 14, 2005 || Catalina || CSS || — || align=right | 2.8 km || 
|-id=803 bgcolor=#d6d6d6
| 399803 ||  || — || September 24, 2005 || Kitt Peak || Spacewatch || KOR || align=right | 1.2 km || 
|-id=804 bgcolor=#E9E9E9
| 399804 ||  || — || September 23, 2005 || Catalina || CSS || — || align=right | 3.3 km || 
|-id=805 bgcolor=#d6d6d6
| 399805 ||  || — || September 24, 2005 || Kitt Peak || Spacewatch || — || align=right | 2.1 km || 
|-id=806 bgcolor=#d6d6d6
| 399806 ||  || — || September 25, 2005 || Kitt Peak || Spacewatch || — || align=right | 2.4 km || 
|-id=807 bgcolor=#fefefe
| 399807 ||  || — || September 24, 2005 || Kitt Peak || Spacewatch || — || align=right data-sort-value="0.57" | 570 m || 
|-id=808 bgcolor=#d6d6d6
| 399808 ||  || — || September 24, 2005 || Kitt Peak || Spacewatch || — || align=right | 2.3 km || 
|-id=809 bgcolor=#d6d6d6
| 399809 ||  || — || September 24, 2005 || Kitt Peak || Spacewatch || — || align=right | 2.2 km || 
|-id=810 bgcolor=#d6d6d6
| 399810 ||  || — || September 14, 2005 || Kitt Peak || Spacewatch || — || align=right | 3.1 km || 
|-id=811 bgcolor=#d6d6d6
| 399811 ||  || — || September 24, 2005 || Kitt Peak || Spacewatch || — || align=right | 2.5 km || 
|-id=812 bgcolor=#fefefe
| 399812 ||  || — || September 26, 2005 || Kitt Peak || Spacewatch || — || align=right data-sort-value="0.70" | 700 m || 
|-id=813 bgcolor=#E9E9E9
| 399813 ||  || — || August 31, 2005 || Anderson Mesa || LONEOS || — || align=right | 2.5 km || 
|-id=814 bgcolor=#FA8072
| 399814 ||  || — || September 29, 2005 || Kitt Peak || Spacewatch || — || align=right data-sort-value="0.54" | 540 m || 
|-id=815 bgcolor=#E9E9E9
| 399815 ||  || — || September 29, 2005 || Anderson Mesa || LONEOS || — || align=right | 2.6 km || 
|-id=816 bgcolor=#E9E9E9
| 399816 ||  || — || September 29, 2005 || Mount Lemmon || Mount Lemmon Survey || — || align=right | 2.4 km || 
|-id=817 bgcolor=#d6d6d6
| 399817 ||  || — || September 30, 2005 || Palomar || NEAT || EOS || align=right | 2.2 km || 
|-id=818 bgcolor=#E9E9E9
| 399818 ||  || — || September 30, 2005 || Palomar || NEAT || — || align=right | 2.5 km || 
|-id=819 bgcolor=#E9E9E9
| 399819 ||  || — || September 22, 2005 || Palomar || NEAT ||  || align=right | 2.2 km || 
|-id=820 bgcolor=#fefefe
| 399820 ||  || — || September 29, 2005 || Kitt Peak || Spacewatch || — || align=right data-sort-value="0.70" | 700 m || 
|-id=821 bgcolor=#E9E9E9
| 399821 ||  || — || September 30, 2005 || Catalina || CSS || — || align=right | 2.3 km || 
|-id=822 bgcolor=#d6d6d6
| 399822 ||  || — || September 27, 2005 || Apache Point || A. C. Becker || — || align=right | 2.9 km || 
|-id=823 bgcolor=#d6d6d6
| 399823 ||  || — || September 30, 2005 || Mount Lemmon || Mount Lemmon Survey || — || align=right | 2.7 km || 
|-id=824 bgcolor=#d6d6d6
| 399824 ||  || — || October 1, 2005 || Kitt Peak || Spacewatch || — || align=right | 2.3 km || 
|-id=825 bgcolor=#d6d6d6
| 399825 ||  || — || October 1, 2005 || Kitt Peak || Spacewatch || — || align=right | 2.5 km || 
|-id=826 bgcolor=#d6d6d6
| 399826 ||  || — || October 1, 2005 || Kitt Peak || Spacewatch || EOS || align=right | 1.7 km || 
|-id=827 bgcolor=#d6d6d6
| 399827 ||  || — || October 3, 2005 || Kitt Peak || Spacewatch || — || align=right | 2.2 km || 
|-id=828 bgcolor=#d6d6d6
| 399828 ||  || — || October 6, 2005 || Kitt Peak || Spacewatch || — || align=right | 2.8 km || 
|-id=829 bgcolor=#d6d6d6
| 399829 ||  || — || October 6, 2005 || Mount Lemmon || Mount Lemmon Survey || — || align=right | 2.2 km || 
|-id=830 bgcolor=#d6d6d6
| 399830 ||  || — || October 4, 2005 || Mount Lemmon || Mount Lemmon Survey || — || align=right | 2.2 km || 
|-id=831 bgcolor=#d6d6d6
| 399831 ||  || — || October 7, 2005 || Kitt Peak || Spacewatch || — || align=right | 2.8 km || 
|-id=832 bgcolor=#d6d6d6
| 399832 ||  || — || October 7, 2005 || Kitt Peak || Spacewatch || — || align=right | 2.2 km || 
|-id=833 bgcolor=#fefefe
| 399833 ||  || — || October 8, 2005 || Kitt Peak || Spacewatch || — || align=right data-sort-value="0.69" | 690 m || 
|-id=834 bgcolor=#d6d6d6
| 399834 ||  || — || October 8, 2005 || Kitt Peak || Spacewatch || EOS || align=right | 1.6 km || 
|-id=835 bgcolor=#d6d6d6
| 399835 ||  || — || October 9, 2005 || Kitt Peak || Spacewatch || — || align=right | 2.1 km || 
|-id=836 bgcolor=#fefefe
| 399836 ||  || — || October 9, 2005 || Kitt Peak || Spacewatch || — || align=right data-sort-value="0.51" | 510 m || 
|-id=837 bgcolor=#E9E9E9
| 399837 ||  || — || August 31, 2005 || Campo Imperatore || CINEOS || — || align=right | 1.9 km || 
|-id=838 bgcolor=#d6d6d6
| 399838 ||  || — || October 22, 2005 || Kitt Peak || Spacewatch || — || align=right | 2.3 km || 
|-id=839 bgcolor=#d6d6d6
| 399839 ||  || — || October 23, 2005 || Catalina || CSS || EUP || align=right | 4.9 km || 
|-id=840 bgcolor=#d6d6d6
| 399840 ||  || — || October 24, 2005 || Kitt Peak || Spacewatch || EOS || align=right | 2.0 km || 
|-id=841 bgcolor=#E9E9E9
| 399841 ||  || — || September 30, 2005 || Catalina || CSS || — || align=right | 2.2 km || 
|-id=842 bgcolor=#d6d6d6
| 399842 ||  || — || October 22, 2005 || Kitt Peak || Spacewatch || KOR || align=right | 1.1 km || 
|-id=843 bgcolor=#d6d6d6
| 399843 ||  || — || October 22, 2005 || Kitt Peak || Spacewatch || — || align=right | 2.3 km || 
|-id=844 bgcolor=#fefefe
| 399844 ||  || — || October 22, 2005 || Kitt Peak || Spacewatch || — || align=right data-sort-value="0.97" | 970 m || 
|-id=845 bgcolor=#fefefe
| 399845 ||  || — || October 22, 2005 || Kitt Peak || Spacewatch || — || align=right data-sort-value="0.77" | 770 m || 
|-id=846 bgcolor=#d6d6d6
| 399846 ||  || — || October 22, 2005 || Catalina || CSS || — || align=right | 5.0 km || 
|-id=847 bgcolor=#d6d6d6
| 399847 ||  || — || October 24, 2005 || Kitt Peak || Spacewatch || — || align=right | 2.3 km || 
|-id=848 bgcolor=#d6d6d6
| 399848 ||  || — || October 24, 2005 || Kitt Peak || Spacewatch || EOS || align=right | 2.3 km || 
|-id=849 bgcolor=#E9E9E9
| 399849 ||  || — || October 25, 2005 || Catalina || CSS || DOR || align=right | 2.8 km || 
|-id=850 bgcolor=#fefefe
| 399850 ||  || — || October 24, 2005 || Kitt Peak || Spacewatch || — || align=right data-sort-value="0.57" | 570 m || 
|-id=851 bgcolor=#d6d6d6
| 399851 ||  || — || October 24, 2005 || Kitt Peak || Spacewatch || VER || align=right | 2.8 km || 
|-id=852 bgcolor=#fefefe
| 399852 ||  || — || October 25, 2005 || Kitt Peak || Spacewatch || — || align=right data-sort-value="0.76" | 760 m || 
|-id=853 bgcolor=#d6d6d6
| 399853 ||  || — || October 1, 2005 || Kitt Peak || Spacewatch || — || align=right | 3.2 km || 
|-id=854 bgcolor=#fefefe
| 399854 ||  || — || October 1, 2005 || Mount Lemmon || Mount Lemmon Survey || — || align=right data-sort-value="0.62" | 620 m || 
|-id=855 bgcolor=#fefefe
| 399855 ||  || — || October 26, 2005 || Kitt Peak || Spacewatch || — || align=right data-sort-value="0.67" | 670 m || 
|-id=856 bgcolor=#fefefe
| 399856 ||  || — || October 26, 2005 || Kitt Peak || Spacewatch || — || align=right data-sort-value="0.81" | 810 m || 
|-id=857 bgcolor=#d6d6d6
| 399857 ||  || — || October 26, 2005 || Kitt Peak || Spacewatch || — || align=right | 2.9 km || 
|-id=858 bgcolor=#d6d6d6
| 399858 ||  || — || October 26, 2005 || Kitt Peak || Spacewatch || — || align=right | 2.9 km || 
|-id=859 bgcolor=#d6d6d6
| 399859 ||  || — || October 26, 2005 || Kitt Peak || Spacewatch || — || align=right | 2.9 km || 
|-id=860 bgcolor=#d6d6d6
| 399860 ||  || — || October 12, 2005 || Kitt Peak || Spacewatch || — || align=right | 2.1 km || 
|-id=861 bgcolor=#d6d6d6
| 399861 ||  || — || October 27, 2005 || Mount Lemmon || Mount Lemmon Survey || — || align=right | 2.8 km || 
|-id=862 bgcolor=#d6d6d6
| 399862 ||  || — || October 29, 2005 || Mount Lemmon || Mount Lemmon Survey || VER || align=right | 2.5 km || 
|-id=863 bgcolor=#E9E9E9
| 399863 ||  || — || October 28, 2005 || Socorro || LINEAR || — || align=right | 2.9 km || 
|-id=864 bgcolor=#d6d6d6
| 399864 ||  || — || October 31, 2005 || Mount Lemmon || Mount Lemmon Survey || — || align=right | 2.4 km || 
|-id=865 bgcolor=#d6d6d6
| 399865 ||  || — || March 26, 2003 || Kitt Peak || Spacewatch || — || align=right | 3.1 km || 
|-id=866 bgcolor=#fefefe
| 399866 ||  || — || October 28, 2005 || Kitt Peak || Spacewatch || — || align=right data-sort-value="0.63" | 630 m || 
|-id=867 bgcolor=#d6d6d6
| 399867 ||  || — || October 28, 2005 || Kitt Peak || Spacewatch || — || align=right | 2.7 km || 
|-id=868 bgcolor=#d6d6d6
| 399868 ||  || — || October 28, 2005 || Kitt Peak || Spacewatch || — || align=right | 4.0 km || 
|-id=869 bgcolor=#d6d6d6
| 399869 ||  || — || October 30, 2005 || Kitt Peak || Spacewatch || EOS || align=right | 1.8 km || 
|-id=870 bgcolor=#E9E9E9
| 399870 ||  || — || October 7, 2005 || Anderson Mesa || LONEOS || — || align=right | 2.3 km || 
|-id=871 bgcolor=#E9E9E9
| 399871 ||  || — || October 5, 2005 || Catalina || CSS || — || align=right | 2.3 km || 
|-id=872 bgcolor=#d6d6d6
| 399872 ||  || — || October 27, 2005 || Catalina || CSS || — || align=right | 3.4 km || 
|-id=873 bgcolor=#d6d6d6
| 399873 ||  || — || October 26, 2005 || Apache Point || A. C. Becker || — || align=right | 2.5 km || 
|-id=874 bgcolor=#d6d6d6
| 399874 ||  || — || November 4, 2005 || Socorro || LINEAR || — || align=right | 3.1 km || 
|-id=875 bgcolor=#d6d6d6
| 399875 ||  || — || September 30, 2005 || Mount Lemmon || Mount Lemmon Survey || — || align=right | 3.8 km || 
|-id=876 bgcolor=#d6d6d6
| 399876 ||  || — || November 4, 2005 || Kitt Peak || Spacewatch || — || align=right | 2.2 km || 
|-id=877 bgcolor=#d6d6d6
| 399877 ||  || — || November 1, 2005 || Anderson Mesa || LONEOS || — || align=right | 4.0 km || 
|-id=878 bgcolor=#d6d6d6
| 399878 ||  || — || November 5, 2005 || Kitt Peak || Spacewatch || EOS || align=right | 2.1 km || 
|-id=879 bgcolor=#fefefe
| 399879 ||  || — || November 6, 2005 || Kitt Peak || Spacewatch || — || align=right data-sort-value="0.61" | 610 m || 
|-id=880 bgcolor=#fefefe
| 399880 ||  || — || November 11, 2005 || Kitt Peak || Spacewatch || — || align=right data-sort-value="0.81" | 810 m || 
|-id=881 bgcolor=#d6d6d6
| 399881 ||  || — || November 1, 2005 || Apache Point || A. C. Becker || — || align=right | 3.4 km || 
|-id=882 bgcolor=#d6d6d6
| 399882 ||  || — || November 20, 2005 || Catalina || CSS || — || align=right | 3.9 km || 
|-id=883 bgcolor=#d6d6d6
| 399883 ||  || — || November 22, 2005 || Kitt Peak || Spacewatch || — || align=right | 3.4 km || 
|-id=884 bgcolor=#d6d6d6
| 399884 ||  || — || November 21, 2005 || Kitt Peak || Spacewatch || VER || align=right | 4.2 km || 
|-id=885 bgcolor=#d6d6d6
| 399885 ||  || — || November 12, 2005 || Kitt Peak || Spacewatch || — || align=right | 2.7 km || 
|-id=886 bgcolor=#d6d6d6
| 399886 ||  || — || November 21, 2005 || Kitt Peak || Spacewatch || — || align=right | 3.7 km || 
|-id=887 bgcolor=#d6d6d6
| 399887 ||  || — || November 22, 2005 || Kitt Peak || Spacewatch || — || align=right | 2.9 km || 
|-id=888 bgcolor=#fefefe
| 399888 ||  || — || November 25, 2005 || Mount Lemmon || Mount Lemmon Survey || — || align=right data-sort-value="0.90" | 900 m || 
|-id=889 bgcolor=#d6d6d6
| 399889 ||  || — || November 25, 2005 || Kitt Peak || Spacewatch || EOS || align=right | 2.4 km || 
|-id=890 bgcolor=#d6d6d6
| 399890 ||  || — || November 25, 2005 || Kitt Peak || Spacewatch || EOS || align=right | 2.4 km || 
|-id=891 bgcolor=#FA8072
| 399891 ||  || — || November 28, 2005 || Socorro || LINEAR || — || align=right | 1.0 km || 
|-id=892 bgcolor=#d6d6d6
| 399892 ||  || — || November 25, 2005 || Kitt Peak || Spacewatch || — || align=right | 3.7 km || 
|-id=893 bgcolor=#d6d6d6
| 399893 ||  || — || November 25, 2005 || Kitt Peak || Spacewatch || — || align=right | 2.5 km || 
|-id=894 bgcolor=#d6d6d6
| 399894 ||  || — || November 4, 2005 || Kitt Peak || Spacewatch || — || align=right | 2.3 km || 
|-id=895 bgcolor=#fefefe
| 399895 ||  || — || November 28, 2005 || Mount Lemmon || Mount Lemmon Survey || V || align=right data-sort-value="0.62" | 620 m || 
|-id=896 bgcolor=#d6d6d6
| 399896 ||  || — || November 3, 2005 || Catalina || CSS || — || align=right | 2.8 km || 
|-id=897 bgcolor=#fefefe
| 399897 ||  || — || November 26, 2005 || Mount Lemmon || Mount Lemmon Survey || — || align=right data-sort-value="0.84" | 840 m || 
|-id=898 bgcolor=#d6d6d6
| 399898 ||  || — || November 26, 2005 || Mount Lemmon || Mount Lemmon Survey || — || align=right | 3.8 km || 
|-id=899 bgcolor=#d6d6d6
| 399899 ||  || — || November 25, 2005 || Catalina || CSS || EOS || align=right | 2.2 km || 
|-id=900 bgcolor=#d6d6d6
| 399900 ||  || — || November 6, 2005 || Mount Lemmon || Mount Lemmon Survey || — || align=right | 2.9 km || 
|}

399901–400000 

|-bgcolor=#d6d6d6
| 399901 ||  || — || November 28, 2005 || Mount Lemmon || Mount Lemmon Survey || HYG || align=right | 2.9 km || 
|-id=902 bgcolor=#d6d6d6
| 399902 ||  || — || November 26, 2005 || Socorro || LINEAR || — || align=right | 4.2 km || 
|-id=903 bgcolor=#fefefe
| 399903 ||  || — || November 29, 2005 || Socorro || LINEAR || H || align=right data-sort-value="0.96" | 960 m || 
|-id=904 bgcolor=#d6d6d6
| 399904 ||  || — || November 30, 2005 || Kitt Peak || Spacewatch || — || align=right | 3.0 km || 
|-id=905 bgcolor=#FA8072
| 399905 ||  || — || December 4, 2005 || Mayhill || A. Lowe || — || align=right data-sort-value="0.62" | 620 m || 
|-id=906 bgcolor=#fefefe
| 399906 ||  || — || December 1, 2005 || Socorro || LINEAR || — || align=right data-sort-value="0.81" | 810 m || 
|-id=907 bgcolor=#d6d6d6
| 399907 ||  || — || October 7, 2005 || Kitt Peak || Spacewatch || LUT || align=right | 6.1 km || 
|-id=908 bgcolor=#d6d6d6
| 399908 ||  || — || December 4, 2005 || Socorro || LINEAR || — || align=right | 2.4 km || 
|-id=909 bgcolor=#d6d6d6
| 399909 ||  || — || December 4, 2005 || Kitt Peak || Spacewatch || — || align=right | 3.3 km || 
|-id=910 bgcolor=#fefefe
| 399910 ||  || — || December 4, 2005 || Kitt Peak || Spacewatch || — || align=right data-sort-value="0.75" | 750 m || 
|-id=911 bgcolor=#d6d6d6
| 399911 ||  || — || December 5, 2005 || Mount Lemmon || Mount Lemmon Survey || — || align=right | 3.8 km || 
|-id=912 bgcolor=#d6d6d6
| 399912 ||  || — || December 6, 2005 || Kitt Peak || Spacewatch || — || align=right | 4.4 km || 
|-id=913 bgcolor=#fefefe
| 399913 ||  || — || December 7, 2005 || Kitt Peak || Spacewatch || — || align=right data-sort-value="0.89" | 890 m || 
|-id=914 bgcolor=#d6d6d6
| 399914 ||  || — || December 10, 2005 || Kitt Peak || Spacewatch || — || align=right | 3.3 km || 
|-id=915 bgcolor=#d6d6d6
| 399915 ||  || — || November 24, 2000 || Kitt Peak || Spacewatch || — || align=right | 3.5 km || 
|-id=916 bgcolor=#fefefe
| 399916 ||  || — || December 22, 2005 || Catalina || CSS || PHO || align=right | 1.4 km || 
|-id=917 bgcolor=#d6d6d6
| 399917 ||  || — || December 22, 2005 || Kitt Peak || Spacewatch || — || align=right | 3.6 km || 
|-id=918 bgcolor=#d6d6d6
| 399918 ||  || — || December 22, 2005 || Kitt Peak || Spacewatch || EUP || align=right | 5.5 km || 
|-id=919 bgcolor=#fefefe
| 399919 ||  || — || December 22, 2005 || Kitt Peak || Spacewatch || — || align=right data-sort-value="0.85" | 850 m || 
|-id=920 bgcolor=#d6d6d6
| 399920 ||  || — || December 2, 2005 || Catalina || CSS || Tj (2.91) || align=right | 6.3 km || 
|-id=921 bgcolor=#d6d6d6
| 399921 ||  || — || December 26, 2005 || Kitt Peak || Spacewatch || — || align=right | 2.9 km || 
|-id=922 bgcolor=#fefefe
| 399922 ||  || — || December 22, 2005 || Kitt Peak || Spacewatch || — || align=right data-sort-value="0.61" | 610 m || 
|-id=923 bgcolor=#d6d6d6
| 399923 ||  || — || December 24, 2005 || Kitt Peak || Spacewatch || EOS || align=right | 2.8 km || 
|-id=924 bgcolor=#d6d6d6
| 399924 ||  || — || December 24, 2005 || Kitt Peak || Spacewatch || — || align=right | 3.4 km || 
|-id=925 bgcolor=#fefefe
| 399925 ||  || — || December 25, 2005 || Mount Lemmon || Mount Lemmon Survey || — || align=right data-sort-value="0.92" | 920 m || 
|-id=926 bgcolor=#d6d6d6
| 399926 ||  || — || December 25, 2005 || Kitt Peak || Spacewatch || — || align=right | 4.2 km || 
|-id=927 bgcolor=#fefefe
| 399927 ||  || — || December 25, 2005 || Mount Lemmon || Mount Lemmon Survey || NYS || align=right data-sort-value="0.60" | 600 m || 
|-id=928 bgcolor=#d6d6d6
| 399928 ||  || — || December 5, 2005 || Mount Lemmon || Mount Lemmon Survey || — || align=right | 3.9 km || 
|-id=929 bgcolor=#d6d6d6
| 399929 ||  || — || December 28, 2005 || Mount Lemmon || Mount Lemmon Survey || — || align=right | 3.2 km || 
|-id=930 bgcolor=#d6d6d6
| 399930 ||  || — || December 28, 2005 || Mount Lemmon || Mount Lemmon Survey || — || align=right | 2.8 km || 
|-id=931 bgcolor=#fefefe
| 399931 ||  || — || December 27, 2005 || Kitt Peak || Spacewatch || — || align=right data-sort-value="0.61" | 610 m || 
|-id=932 bgcolor=#d6d6d6
| 399932 ||  || — || December 28, 2005 || Kitt Peak || Spacewatch || — || align=right | 3.8 km || 
|-id=933 bgcolor=#d6d6d6
| 399933 ||  || — || December 25, 2005 || Kitt Peak || Spacewatch || — || align=right | 4.3 km || 
|-id=934 bgcolor=#d6d6d6
| 399934 ||  || — || December 25, 2005 || Mount Lemmon || Mount Lemmon Survey || — || align=right | 3.5 km || 
|-id=935 bgcolor=#fefefe
| 399935 ||  || — || December 29, 2005 || Kitt Peak || Spacewatch || NYS || align=right data-sort-value="0.64" | 640 m || 
|-id=936 bgcolor=#d6d6d6
| 399936 ||  || — || October 28, 2005 || Mount Lemmon || Mount Lemmon Survey || — || align=right | 2.1 km || 
|-id=937 bgcolor=#d6d6d6
| 399937 ||  || — || December 28, 2005 || Kitt Peak || Spacewatch || — || align=right | 2.3 km || 
|-id=938 bgcolor=#d6d6d6
| 399938 ||  || — || December 29, 2005 || Kitt Peak || Spacewatch || — || align=right | 2.7 km || 
|-id=939 bgcolor=#fefefe
| 399939 ||  || — || December 27, 2005 || Mount Lemmon || Mount Lemmon Survey || — || align=right | 1.1 km || 
|-id=940 bgcolor=#d6d6d6
| 399940 ||  || — || December 29, 2005 || Kitt Peak || Spacewatch || — || align=right | 2.7 km || 
|-id=941 bgcolor=#d6d6d6
| 399941 ||  || — || October 30, 2005 || Mount Lemmon || Mount Lemmon Survey || — || align=right | 2.7 km || 
|-id=942 bgcolor=#d6d6d6
| 399942 ||  || — || December 25, 2005 || Mount Lemmon || Mount Lemmon Survey || BRA || align=right | 1.8 km || 
|-id=943 bgcolor=#d6d6d6
| 399943 ||  || — || January 4, 2006 || Kitt Peak || Spacewatch || VER || align=right | 2.9 km || 
|-id=944 bgcolor=#d6d6d6
| 399944 ||  || — || January 5, 2006 || Socorro || LINEAR || — || align=right | 3.6 km || 
|-id=945 bgcolor=#fefefe
| 399945 ||  || — || January 4, 2006 || Kitt Peak || Spacewatch || — || align=right data-sort-value="0.67" | 670 m || 
|-id=946 bgcolor=#d6d6d6
| 399946 ||  || — || December 28, 2005 || Mount Lemmon || Mount Lemmon Survey || — || align=right | 2.4 km || 
|-id=947 bgcolor=#d6d6d6
| 399947 ||  || — || January 4, 2006 || Kitt Peak || Spacewatch || — || align=right | 3.1 km || 
|-id=948 bgcolor=#fefefe
| 399948 ||  || — || January 4, 2006 || Kitt Peak || Spacewatch || NYS || align=right data-sort-value="0.71" | 710 m || 
|-id=949 bgcolor=#d6d6d6
| 399949 ||  || — || December 2, 2005 || Mount Lemmon || Mount Lemmon Survey || EOS || align=right | 2.0 km || 
|-id=950 bgcolor=#fefefe
| 399950 ||  || — || January 6, 2006 || Kitt Peak || Spacewatch || — || align=right data-sort-value="0.80" | 800 m || 
|-id=951 bgcolor=#d6d6d6
| 399951 ||  || — || December 2, 2005 || Mount Lemmon || Mount Lemmon Survey || — || align=right | 4.2 km || 
|-id=952 bgcolor=#fefefe
| 399952 ||  || — || December 26, 2005 || Kitt Peak || Spacewatch || — || align=right data-sort-value="0.73" | 730 m || 
|-id=953 bgcolor=#fefefe
| 399953 ||  || — || January 6, 2006 || Kitt Peak || Spacewatch || — || align=right data-sort-value="0.68" | 680 m || 
|-id=954 bgcolor=#fefefe
| 399954 ||  || — || January 4, 2006 || Kitt Peak || Spacewatch || NYS || align=right data-sort-value="0.79" | 790 m || 
|-id=955 bgcolor=#d6d6d6
| 399955 ||  || — || January 8, 2006 || Kitt Peak || Spacewatch || VER || align=right | 3.0 km || 
|-id=956 bgcolor=#fefefe
| 399956 ||  || — || December 27, 2005 || Mount Lemmon || Mount Lemmon Survey || — || align=right | 1.0 km || 
|-id=957 bgcolor=#fefefe
| 399957 ||  || — || January 5, 2006 || Kitt Peak || Spacewatch || V || align=right data-sort-value="0.57" | 570 m || 
|-id=958 bgcolor=#fefefe
| 399958 ||  || — || January 21, 2006 || Kitt Peak || Spacewatch || — || align=right data-sort-value="0.83" | 830 m || 
|-id=959 bgcolor=#d6d6d6
| 399959 ||  || — || January 22, 2006 || Mount Lemmon || Mount Lemmon Survey || — || align=right | 3.6 km || 
|-id=960 bgcolor=#d6d6d6
| 399960 ||  || — || January 23, 2006 || Kitt Peak || Spacewatch || — || align=right | 2.4 km || 
|-id=961 bgcolor=#d6d6d6
| 399961 ||  || — || December 6, 2005 || Kitt Peak || Spacewatch || — || align=right | 4.0 km || 
|-id=962 bgcolor=#fefefe
| 399962 ||  || — || January 25, 2006 || Kitt Peak || Spacewatch || — || align=right data-sort-value="0.93" | 930 m || 
|-id=963 bgcolor=#d6d6d6
| 399963 ||  || — || January 22, 2006 || Catalina || CSS || EOS || align=right | 2.8 km || 
|-id=964 bgcolor=#d6d6d6
| 399964 ||  || — || January 23, 2006 || Kitt Peak || Spacewatch || — || align=right | 2.9 km || 
|-id=965 bgcolor=#d6d6d6
| 399965 ||  || — || January 23, 2006 || Kitt Peak || Spacewatch || EOS || align=right | 2.2 km || 
|-id=966 bgcolor=#fefefe
| 399966 ||  || — || January 23, 2006 || Kitt Peak || Spacewatch || V || align=right data-sort-value="0.67" | 670 m || 
|-id=967 bgcolor=#d6d6d6
| 399967 ||  || — || January 7, 2006 || Mount Lemmon || Mount Lemmon Survey || VER || align=right | 3.2 km || 
|-id=968 bgcolor=#fefefe
| 399968 ||  || — || January 26, 2006 || Kitt Peak || Spacewatch || NYS || align=right data-sort-value="0.63" | 630 m || 
|-id=969 bgcolor=#d6d6d6
| 399969 ||  || — || January 25, 2006 || Kitt Peak || Spacewatch || — || align=right | 3.2 km || 
|-id=970 bgcolor=#fefefe
| 399970 ||  || — || January 26, 2006 || Kitt Peak || Spacewatch || MAS || align=right data-sort-value="0.63" | 630 m || 
|-id=971 bgcolor=#fefefe
| 399971 ||  || — || January 26, 2006 || Mount Lemmon || Mount Lemmon Survey || — || align=right data-sort-value="0.80" | 800 m || 
|-id=972 bgcolor=#fefefe
| 399972 ||  || — || January 26, 2006 || Kitt Peak || Spacewatch || — || align=right data-sort-value="0.97" | 970 m || 
|-id=973 bgcolor=#fefefe
| 399973 ||  || — || January 26, 2006 || Kitt Peak || Spacewatch || — || align=right data-sort-value="0.71" | 710 m || 
|-id=974 bgcolor=#d6d6d6
| 399974 ||  || — || January 25, 2006 || Kitt Peak || Spacewatch || — || align=right | 5.2 km || 
|-id=975 bgcolor=#fefefe
| 399975 ||  || — || January 25, 2006 || Kitt Peak || Spacewatch || MAS || align=right data-sort-value="0.78" | 780 m || 
|-id=976 bgcolor=#fefefe
| 399976 ||  || — || January 27, 2006 || Kitt Peak || Spacewatch || — || align=right data-sort-value="0.88" | 880 m || 
|-id=977 bgcolor=#fefefe
| 399977 ||  || — || January 27, 2006 || Mount Lemmon || Mount Lemmon Survey || — || align=right data-sort-value="0.90" | 900 m || 
|-id=978 bgcolor=#fefefe
| 399978 ||  || — || January 27, 2006 || Mount Lemmon || Mount Lemmon Survey || MAS || align=right data-sort-value="0.74" | 740 m || 
|-id=979 bgcolor=#fefefe
| 399979 Lewseaman ||  ||  || January 30, 2006 || Catalina || CSS || PHO || align=right | 1.1 km || 
|-id=980 bgcolor=#fefefe
| 399980 ||  || — || January 30, 2006 || Bergisch Gladbach || W. Bickel || NYS || align=right data-sort-value="0.77" | 770 m || 
|-id=981 bgcolor=#fefefe
| 399981 ||  || — || January 31, 2006 || Kitt Peak || Spacewatch || — || align=right data-sort-value="0.83" | 830 m || 
|-id=982 bgcolor=#d6d6d6
| 399982 ||  || — || January 23, 2006 || Kitt Peak || Spacewatch || 7:4 || align=right | 3.7 km || 
|-id=983 bgcolor=#fefefe
| 399983 ||  || — || December 5, 2005 || Mount Lemmon || Mount Lemmon Survey || — || align=right data-sort-value="0.84" | 840 m || 
|-id=984 bgcolor=#d6d6d6
| 399984 ||  || — || January 31, 2006 || Kitt Peak || Spacewatch || 7:4 || align=right | 3.7 km || 
|-id=985 bgcolor=#fefefe
| 399985 ||  || — || January 31, 2006 || Kitt Peak || Spacewatch || — || align=right data-sort-value="0.79" | 790 m || 
|-id=986 bgcolor=#d6d6d6
| 399986 ||  || — || January 26, 2006 || Mount Lemmon || Mount Lemmon Survey || — || align=right | 4.4 km || 
|-id=987 bgcolor=#fefefe
| 399987 ||  || — || January 26, 2006 || Kitt Peak || Spacewatch || — || align=right data-sort-value="0.91" | 910 m || 
|-id=988 bgcolor=#d6d6d6
| 399988 ||  || — || January 21, 2006 || Mount Lemmon || Mount Lemmon Survey || — || align=right | 3.6 km || 
|-id=989 bgcolor=#fefefe
| 399989 ||  || — || February 2, 2006 || Kitt Peak || Spacewatch || — || align=right data-sort-value="0.69" | 690 m || 
|-id=990 bgcolor=#fefefe
| 399990 ||  || — || February 2, 2006 || Mount Lemmon || Mount Lemmon Survey || — || align=right | 1.00 km || 
|-id=991 bgcolor=#fefefe
| 399991 ||  || — || February 4, 2006 || Kitt Peak || Spacewatch || MAS || align=right data-sort-value="0.63" | 630 m || 
|-id=992 bgcolor=#d6d6d6
| 399992 ||  || — || January 31, 2006 || Kitt Peak || Spacewatch || — || align=right | 3.5 km || 
|-id=993 bgcolor=#d6d6d6
| 399993 ||  || — || February 23, 2006 || Mount Lemmon || Mount Lemmon Survey || — || align=right | 5.0 km || 
|-id=994 bgcolor=#fefefe
| 399994 ||  || — || February 20, 2006 || Kitt Peak || Spacewatch || MAS || align=right data-sort-value="0.66" | 660 m || 
|-id=995 bgcolor=#fefefe
| 399995 ||  || — || February 2, 2006 || Mount Lemmon || Mount Lemmon Survey || — || align=right data-sort-value="0.69" | 690 m || 
|-id=996 bgcolor=#fefefe
| 399996 ||  || — || February 20, 2006 || Kitt Peak || Spacewatch || — || align=right data-sort-value="0.90" | 900 m || 
|-id=997 bgcolor=#fefefe
| 399997 ||  || — || February 20, 2006 || Kitt Peak || Spacewatch || NYS || align=right data-sort-value="0.79" | 790 m || 
|-id=998 bgcolor=#fefefe
| 399998 ||  || — || February 25, 2006 || Kitt Peak || Spacewatch || — || align=right data-sort-value="0.71" | 710 m || 
|-id=999 bgcolor=#fefefe
| 399999 ||  || — || February 27, 2006 || Kitt Peak || Spacewatch || V || align=right data-sort-value="0.66" | 660 m || 
|-id=000 bgcolor=#fefefe
| 400000 ||  || — || February 27, 2006 || Kitt Peak || Spacewatch || MAS || align=right data-sort-value="0.65" | 650 m || 
|}

References

External links 
 Discovery Circumstances: Numbered Minor Planets (395001)–(400000) (IAU Minor Planet Center)

0399